= Simon Peter Kamomoe =

Kenyan Catholic prelate (born 1962)

The Most Reverend Simon Peter Kamomoe
- Bishop of Wote, Kenya
- Church: Catholic Church
- Archdiocese: Roman Catholic Archdiocese of Nairobi
- See: Roman Catholic Diocese of Wote
- Appointed: 14 May 2026
- Installed: 14 May 2026
- Predecessor: Paul Kariuki Njiru (22 July 2023 - 25 March 2026)
- Other post: Auxiliary Bishop of Nairobi (13 February 2024 - 5 July 2025)
- Previous post: Auxiliary Bishop of Wote (5 July 2025 - 14 May 2026)

Orders
- Ordination: 18 June 1994
- Consecration: 6 April 2024 by Hubertus Matheus Maria van Megen

Personal details
- Born: Simon Peter Kamomoe; 26 November 1962 (age 63) Gatundu, Archdiocese of Nairobi, Kenya

Simon Peter Kamomoe (born 26 November 1962) is a Kenyan prelate of the Catholic Church who is the Bishop of the Roman Catholic Diocese of Wote, since 14 May 2026. Before that, from 5 February 2025 until 14 May 2026, he served as auxiliary bishop of the same Catholic See. From 13 February 2024 until 5 July 2025, he was auxiliary bishop of the Roman Catholic Archdiocese of Nairobi. He was appointed bishop on the 13 February 2024 by Pope Francis. He was concurrently appointed Titular Bishop of Thubunae in Numidia. He was consecrated as bishop in Nairobi on 6 April 2024. On 5 July 2025, Pope Leo XIV transferred him to the Diocese of Wote, as auxiliary bishop. He was appointed local ordinary at Wote on 14 May 2026.

== Early life and education ==
He was born on 26 November 1962 in Gatundu, Kiambu County, Kenya. He attended Muthiga Primary School. For his O-Level studies, he went to Ituru High School. He then joined Queen of Apostles Junior Seminary in 1984, where he pursued his A-Level education, matriculating in 1986.

In 1986, he joined St. Mary's Seminary in Molo, for one year. He then transferred to St. Augustine Seminary, Mabanga, from 1987 until 1988, where he studied Philosophy. He then pursued Theology at St. Matthias Mulumba Tindinyo Seminary, from 1989 until 1992.

From 2005 until 2008 he studied at the University of Nairobi, graduating with Bachelor's degree in Counselling Psychology. He also studied at Tangaza University College, in Kenya between 2013 and 2015, where he obtained a Master's degree in Psychology. He holds a Doctorate of Philosophy degree in Counselling Psychology, awarded by the Catholic University of Eastern Africa in 2021, having studied there from 2016.

== Priest ==
He was ordained deacon of Nairobi Archdiocese in 1992 at St. Matthias Mulumba Seminary Tindinyo and was ordained a priest by Cardinal Maurice Michael Otunga, Archbishop of Nairobi, Kenya and Cardinal-Priest of San Gregorio Barbarigo alle Tre Fontane, on 18 June 1994 at Nairobi.

He served in various roles while priest, including as:

- Assistant priest responsible for Queen of Apostles Seminary and Parish, effective 18 June 1994.
- Parish priest of Thigio Parish
- Parish priest of Mangu Parish
- Parish priest of Ndundu Parish
- Parish priest of St. Matthias Mulumba Parish, Thika
- Priest in charge of Our Lady of Fatima Kiriko Parish from 1998 until 1999
- Priest in charge of Kiambu Parish in 1999
- Administrator of the Holy Family Minor Basilica, Nairobi
- Chaplain in the Family Life Department.

== Bishop ==
On 13 February 2024 Pope Francis appointed him auxiliary bishop of the archdiocese of Nairobi, Kenya. He was contemporaneously appointed Titular Bishop of Thubunae in Numidia. He was consecrated bishop and installed by Archbishop Hubertus Matheus Maria van Megen, Titular Archbishop of Novaliciana and Papal Nuncio, assisted by Archbishop Philip Arnold Subira Anyolo, Archbishop of Nairobi and Bishop David Kamau Ng'ang'a, Titular Bishop of Oëa and Auxiliary Bishop of Nairobi.

Also consecrated at the same place on the same date was Bishop Wallace Ng'ang'a Gachihi, Titular Bishop of Thucca in Mauretania. He served as Auxiliary Bishop of Nairobi from 13 February 2024 until 15 August 2024 when he was appointed Bishop of the Military Ordinariate of Kenya.

On 5 July 2025, The Holy Father transferred Bishop Simon Peter Kamomoe from Nairobi to Wote, a suffragan diocese, to serve as auxiliary bishop there. He is expected to work with the local ordinary, Bishop Paul Kariuki Njiru, who is reported to have suffered a stroke in 2024. He has been unable to speak since then. On 21 September 2025, The Holy Father appointed him Apostolic Administrator of the Diocese of Wote, taking over from Bishop Norman King'oo Wambua of the neighboring Roman Catholic Diocese of Machakos.

On 14 May 2026, Pope Leo XIV appointed him bishop of Wote, succeeding Bishop Paul Kariuki Njiru, the previous local ordinary, who resigned on 25 March 2026.

== See also ==
- Catholic Church in Kenya

== Succession table ==
Catholic Church titles
Preceded by Paul Kariuki Njiru (22 July 2023 - 25 March 2026)	Bishop of Wote (since 14 May 2026)	Succeeded by Incumbent
Preceded by	Auxiliary Bishop of Wote (5 July 2025 - 14 May 2026)	Succeeded by
Preceded by	Auxiliary Bishop of Nairobi (13 February 2024 - 5 July 2025)	Succeeded by
