= Paul Kariuki Njiru =

Kenyan Reman Catholic prelate (born 1963)

- Bishop Emeritus of Wote, Kenya
- Church: Roman Catholic Church
- Archdiocese: Roman Catholic Archdiocese of Nairobi
- See: Diocese of Wote
- Appointed: 22 July 2023
- Installed: 30 September 2023
- Term ended: 25 March 2026
- Previous posts: Bishop of Embu, Kenya (2009–2023)

Orders
- Ordination: 3 January 1993
- Consecration: 25 July 2009 by Cardinal John Njue
- Rank: Bishop

Personal details
- Born: Paul Kariuki Njiru; 11 March 1963 (age 63) Kathunguri, Embu Diocese, Kenya

Styles of Paul Kariuki Njiru
- Reference style
- Religious style: Bishop

Paul Kariuki Njiru (born 11 March 1963) is a Roman Catholic prelate in Kenya, who served as the Bishop of the Roman Catholic Diocese of Wote, Kenya from 22 July 2023 until his resignation on 25 March 2026. Prior to his appointment as Bishop of Wote, he served as the Bishop of the Diocese of Embu, Kenya from 25 July 2009 until 22 July 2023. He was appointed bishop on 9 May 2009 by Pope Benedict XVI. He was consecrated at Embu, Kenya on 25 July 2009 by Cardinal John Njue, Archbishop of Nairobi. On 22 July 2023, Pope Francis transferred him to the diocese of Wote and appointed him local ordinary there. Pope Leo XIV accepted the bishop's early resignation on 25 March 2026 at the age of 63 years.

== Early life and education ==
He was born on 11 March 1963 in Kathunguri, Embu County, in the Diocese of Embu. He studied at St. Joseph's Seminary, Molo and then at St. Thomas Aquinas Seminary in Nairobi.

In 1991 the Pontifical Urban University awarded him a Bachelor's degree for his studies while in Kenya. Later, having studied for six years in Rome, he was awarded a Master of Sacred Theology (STL) in 1999. In 2002, he graduated with a Doctor of Sacred Theology (STD) in Biblical Theology from the Pontifical Gregorian University, also in Rome.

== Priesthood ==
He was ordained to the priesthood for the Diocese of Embu on 3 January 1993. As a parish priest, he worked in Kairuri Parish and served as a diocesan youth chaplain. He was the education secretary for Catholic schools in Embu Diocese.

== Bishop of Embu ==
On 9 May 2009 Pope Benedict XVI appointed him Bishop of the Catholic Diocese of Embu. He was ordained and installed on 25 July 2009 by Cardinal John Cardinal Njue, Archbishop of Nairobi assisted by Peter Joseph Kairo, Archbishop of Nyeri, and Anthony Muheria, Bishop of Kitui.

He served as the chairman of the Catholic Health Commission of Kenya, a commission formed by the Kenyan Bishops' Conference. As chairman, he oversaw the 58 hospitals, 83 health centers, 311 dispensaries, and 17 medical training institutions owned and operated by the Catholic Church in Keny'a.

== Bishop of Wote ==
On 22 July 2023 Pope Francis appointed him as the founder bishop of the Roman Catholic Diocese of Wote, that was established from splitting the Diocese of Machakos. He was installed as the new bishop on 30 September 2023. At his installation ceremony he promised to "work together with all leaders in Wote Diocese to find solutions to pressing issues".

When in December 2023, Pope Francis issued a statement allowing priests to bless same-sex unions, Bishop Njiru prohibited such blessings in Wote Diocese.

== Alleged plagiarism ==
In a 2024 book about plagiarism at the Gregorian University, researchers Michael Dougherty and Alkuin Schachenmayr argued that Njiru's dissertation was plagiarized, showing that very many passages were copied from uncredited authors like cardinals Leo Joseph Suenens and Albert Vanhoye.

== Illness ==
In 2024 Njiru fell ill. The pope appointed Norman King'oo Wambua, Bishop of Machakos, as the Apostolic Administrator of the Diocese of Wote, with "full authority over all diocesan matters," effective 28 September 2024. That administratorship ended on 5 July 2025, when Pope Leo XIV appointed Bishop Simon Peter Kamomoe, previously an auxiliary bishop in Nairobi as auxiliary bishop at Wote, to work with Bishop Kariuki Njiru, who is reported to have suffered a stroke in the summer of 2024. Since then he has been unable to speak.

== Publications ==
- Charisms and the Holy Spirit's Activity in the Body of Christ: An Exegetical-Theological Study of 1 Corinthians 12,4–11 and Romans 12,6–8 (Doctoral dissertation) (Rome: Ed. Pontificia Univ. Gregoriana, 2002).

== See also ==
- Roman Catholicism in Kenya

== Succession table ==
Catholic Church titles
Preceded by Anthony Muheria (Bishop) (2003–2008)	Bishop of Roman Catholic Diocese of Embu; 2009 - 2023	Succeeded by Peter Kimani Ndung'u (Bishop) (2023–present)

Preceded by New	Bishop of Roman Catholic Diocese of Wote; 22 July 2023 - 25 March 2026	Succeeded by Vacant
