= Norman King'oo Wambua =

Kenyan Roman Catholic Prelate

- Bishop of Machakos. Kenya.
- Church: Roman Catholic Church
- Archdiocese: Nairobi
- Appointed: 23 June 2018
- Installed: 25 August 2018
- Predecessor: Martin Kivuva Musonde (Bishop) (15 March 2003 - 9 December 2014) Appointed, Archbishop of Mombasa
- Previous posts: Bishop of Bungoma, Kenya (August 1998–June 2018).

Orders
- Ordination: 22 May 1988
- Consecration: 16 August 1998 by Cardinal Jozef Tomko
- Rank: Bishop

Personal details
- Born: Norman King'oo Wambua; 1952 (age 73–74) Kithiani, Kilungu Machakos, Kenya

Styles of Norman King'oo Wambua
- Reference style
- Religious style: Bishop

Norman King'oo Wambua is a Roman Catholic prelate in Kenya, who was installed as the Bishop of the Roman Catholic Diocese of Machakos, in Kenya on 25 August 2018. Before his installation as Bishop of Machakos, he was the Bishop of the Diocese of Bungoma, Kenya, serving there from August 1998 until June 2018. He was appointed bishop on 27 June 1998 by Pope John Paul II.

== Early life and education ==
He was born in 1952 in Kathiani, Makueni County, in the Diocese of Wote. He attended Enzai Primary School from 1962 to 1969. His family relocated to Kitale in Trans-Nzoia County and he attended Kitale Day Secondary School (today: St. Anthony Secondary School), from 1970 until 1973. He then joined Thongoto Teachers' College in Kikuyu in 1974 graduating in 1976.

From 1979 until 1981, he studied in Form 5 and 6 at Tindinyo College, which was a Minor Seminary under the Diocese of Kakamega. In 1982, he joined Saint Augustine Senior Seminary in Mabanga, Bungoma, Kenya, where he pursued philosophical studies. He left Mabanga in 1984 and in August the same year he joined Saint Thomas Aquinas seminary Nairobi for theological studies.

== Priesthood ==
He was ordained priest on 22 May 1988, by the late Bishop John Christopher Mahon. Father Norman King’oo Wambua was posted to Saint Augustine's Cathedral Parish in Lodwar, in Turkana County, serving there from May 1988 until September 1990. Then Bishop Mahon sent him to Ireland for further studies where he pursued Systematic Theology and came back to the Diocese in 1992. When he returned to Kenya, the Bishop sent him to serve as the Parish Priest at Kanamkemer Parish in Lodwar Town, where he worked from 1992 until 1995. He was then appointed as the principal of Kakuma High School where he worked until 1997.

== As bishop ==
On 27 June 1998 Pope John Paul II appointed Father Norman King’oo Wambua, as Bishop of the Catholic Diocese of Bungoma. He was consecrated and installed bishop on 16 August 1998 by Cardinal Jozef Tomko, Cardinal-Priest of Santa Sabina and Apostolic Nuncio to Kenya. He was assisted by Archbishop Zacchaeus Okoth, Archbishop of Kisumu and Bishop Cornelius Kipng'eno Arap Korir, Bishop of Eldoret.

On 23 June 2018, Pope Francis appointed him as the Bishop of Machakos. He was installed in Machakos on 25 August 2018. In 2024, Bishop Paul Kariuki Njiru of the Roman Catholic Diocese of Wote fell ill. Bishop Norman King'oo Wambua of the neighboring Catholic Diocese of Machakos was appointed as Apostolic Administrator of the Diocese of Wote, effective 28 September 2024. That administratorship ceased on 21 September 2025, when it was transferred to Bishop Simon Peter Kamomoe, the auxiliary bishop of the Diocese of Wote.

== See also ==
- Roman Catholicism in Kenya

== Succession table ==
Catholic Church titles
Preceded by Longinus Atundo (1987–1996)	Bishop of Roman Catholic Diocese of Bungoma; 1998 - 2018	Succeeded by Mark Kadima Wamukoya (2021-present)

Catholic Church titles
Preceded by Martin Kivuva Musonde (2003–2014)	Bishop of Roman Catholic Diocese of Machakos; 2018 - present	Succeeded by Incumbent
