= Obed Muriungi Karobia =

Kenyan Catholic prelate (born 1979)

The Most Reverend Obed Muriungi Karobia
- Auxiliary Bishop of Nairobi, Kenya
- Church: Catholic Church
- Archdiocese: Roman Catholic Archdiocese of Nairobi
- See: Nairobi
- Appointed: 26 March 2026
- Installed: 6 May 2026

Orders
- Ordination: 28 July 2012
- Consecration: 6 May 2026 by Hubertus Matheus Maria van Megen
- Rank: Bishop

Personal details
- Born: Obed Muriungi Karobia; 29 June 1979 (age 47) Meru, Diocese of Meru, Meru County, Kenya

Styles of Obed Muriungi Karobia
- Reference style: Your Lordship; The Most Reverend
- Spoken style: His Lordship
- Religious style: Bishop

Obed Muriungi Karobia O.F.M. (born 29 June 1979) is a Kenyan Catholic prelate who was appointed Auxiliary Bishop of the Roman Catholic Archdiocese of Nairobi in Kenya on 26 March 2026. He was contemporaneously assigned as Titular Bishop of Thimida. Before that, from 28 July 2012 until his appointment as bishop, he served as a priest of the Order of Friars Minor Conventual, a Catholic religious order. He was appointed bishop by Pope Leo XIV. His episcopal consecration took place on 6 May 2026.

== Background and education ==
He was born on 29 June 1979 at Meru, Diocese of Meru, Meru County, in Kenya. He studied philosophy at Saint Bonaventure University College in Lusaka, Zambia. He graduated with a Bachelor's degree in theology from Tangaza University College in Kenya (at that time a constituent college of the Catholic University of Eastern Africa). As of April 2026, he is a registered Doctor of Philosophy candidate in psychology at Daystar University, Nairobi, Kenya.

== Priest ==
He took his preliminary vows as a member of the Order of Friars Minor Conventual (O.F.M.) on 24 July 2004. He took his perpertual vows for the same religious order on 10 October 2010. He was ordained a priest for his religious order on 28 July 2012. He served as a priest until 26 March 2026. While a priest, he served in various roles and locations, including:

- Supreme moderator of the Franciscan Servants of Mary Queen of Love public association of the faithful in the Diocese of Ngong from 2024 until 2026.
- President of the African Federation of Friars Minor Conventual from 2020 until 2023.
- Provincial minister of the Kenyan Province of the Friars Minor Conventual from 2019 until 2023.
- Formator and bursar of the House of Formation of his Institute in Nairobi from 2016 until 2019.
- Head of vocations in the Custody of the Friars Minor Conventual of Kenya from 2012 until 2019.
- Parish priest of Saint Catherine of Alexandria in Nairobi from 2013 until 2016.
- Parish vicar of Saint Catherine of Alexandria in Nairobi from 2012 until 2013.

== Bishop ==
On 26 March 2026, Pope Leo XIV appointed him Auxiliary Bishop of the Archdiocese of Nairobi. At that time he was the youngest Roman Catholic bishop in Kenya at the age of 46 years. He received his episcopal consecration on 6 May 2026 (Feast day of Saint Dominic Savio) from Archbishop Hubertus van Megen, the co-consecrators being Archbishop Philip Anyolo and Bishop David Kamau Ng'ang'a.

== See also ==
- Catholic Church in Kenya

== Succession table ==
Catholic Church titles
Preceded by	Auxiliary Bishop of Nairobi (since 6th May 2026)	Succeeded by
