= Wallace Ng'ang'a Gachihi =

Kenyan Roman Catholic Prelate

- Bishop of Kenya, Military
- Church: Roman Catholic Church
- See: Immediately subject to the Holy See
- Appointed: 15 August 2024
- Installed: 12 October 2024
- Predecessor: Alfred Kipkoech Arap Rotich (Bishop: 29 August 1997 - 30 December 2016)
- Previous posts: Auxiliary Bishop of Nairobi, Kenya (February 2024–15 August 2024).

Orders
- Ordination: 21 May 2005
- Consecration: 6 April 2024 by Hubertus Matheus Maria van Megen
- Rank: Bishop

Personal details
- Born: Wallace Ng'ang'a Gachihi; March 26, 1973 (age 53) Gatundu, Nairobi, Kenya

Styles of Wallace Ng'ang'a Gachihi
- Reference style
- Religious style: Bishop

Wallace Ng'ang'a Gachihi is a Roman Catholic prelate in Kenya, who was installed as the Bishop of the Military Ordinariate of Kenya on 12 August 2024 by Archbishop Hubertus Matheus Maria van Megen, the Apostolic Nuncio to Kenya. Prior to his appointment as Bishop of the Military Ordinariate of Kenya, he served as an Auxiliary Bishop of the Roman Catholic Archdiocese of Nairobi, Kenya. He was appointed bishop on 13 February 2024 by Pope Francis.

== Early life and education ==
He was born on 26 March 1973 in Gatundu, Kiambu County, in the Archdiocese of Nairobi. He attended St. Mary's Molo Seminary in 1996 for his spiritual year. Later from 1997 till 1998, he did his philosophical studies at St. Augustine Major Seminary in Mabanga, Bungoma, Kenya. From 1999 to 2003 he did his theological studies at St. Matia Mulumba Major Seminary, in Nairobi. He also holds a Master's Degree in Pastoral Theology awarded by the Catholic University of Eastern Africa, in Nairobi.

== Priesthood ==
He took vows as a deacon on 15 May 2004. He was ordained a priest on 21 May 2005 at Nairobi. He served as a priest of the Archdiocese of Nairobi. Over the years, he has served in various roles in the Catholic Church, including as:

- Deacon at St. John the Evangelist Parish, Githiga.
- Deacon at the Saints Peter and Paul Catholic Church in Kiambu
- Assistant Father-in-Charge at Saints Peter and Paul Catholic Church in Kiambu
- Father in Charge at St. Peter the Apostle Kikuyu Parish
- Assistant Parish Priest at Regina Caeli Parish, Karen
- Pastoral Coordinator of the Archdiocese of Nairobi
- Parish Priest at Christ the King Church, Embakasi
- Father in Charge at Queen of Apostles Parish, Ruaraka.

== As bishop ==
On 13 February 2024 Pope Francis appointed Father Wallace Ng'ang'a Gachihi, as an Auxiliary Bishop of the Catholic Archdiocese of Nairobi. He was consecrated and installed bishop on 6 April 2024 by Archbishop Hubertus Matheus Maria van Megen, Titular Archbishop of Novaliciana and Apostolic Nuncio to Kenya. He was assisted by Archbishop Philip Arnold Subira Anyolo, Archbishop of Nairobi and Bishop David Kamau Ng'ang'a, Titular Bishop of Oëa and Auxiliary Bishop of Nairobi.

On 15 August 2024, Pope Francis appointed him as the Bishop of the Military Ordinariate of Kenya. He was installed as the third Ordinary of Kenya Military on 12 October 2024, replacing Bishop Alfred Kipkoech Arap Rotich who, served in that role from 1997 until his retirement in 2016.

== See also ==
- Roman Catholicism in Kenya
- Simon Peter Kamomoe

== Succession table ==
Catholic Church titles
Preceded by Alfred Kipkoech Arap Rotich (1997–2016)	Bishop of Military Ordinariate of Kenya; 2024 - present	Succeeded by Incumbent
Titular church created	Titular Bishop of Thucca in Mauretania; Since 13 February 2024	Incumbent
