= Cathedral Basilica of the Holy Family, Nairobi =

Holy Family Minor Basilica
- Cathedral Basilica of the Holy Family
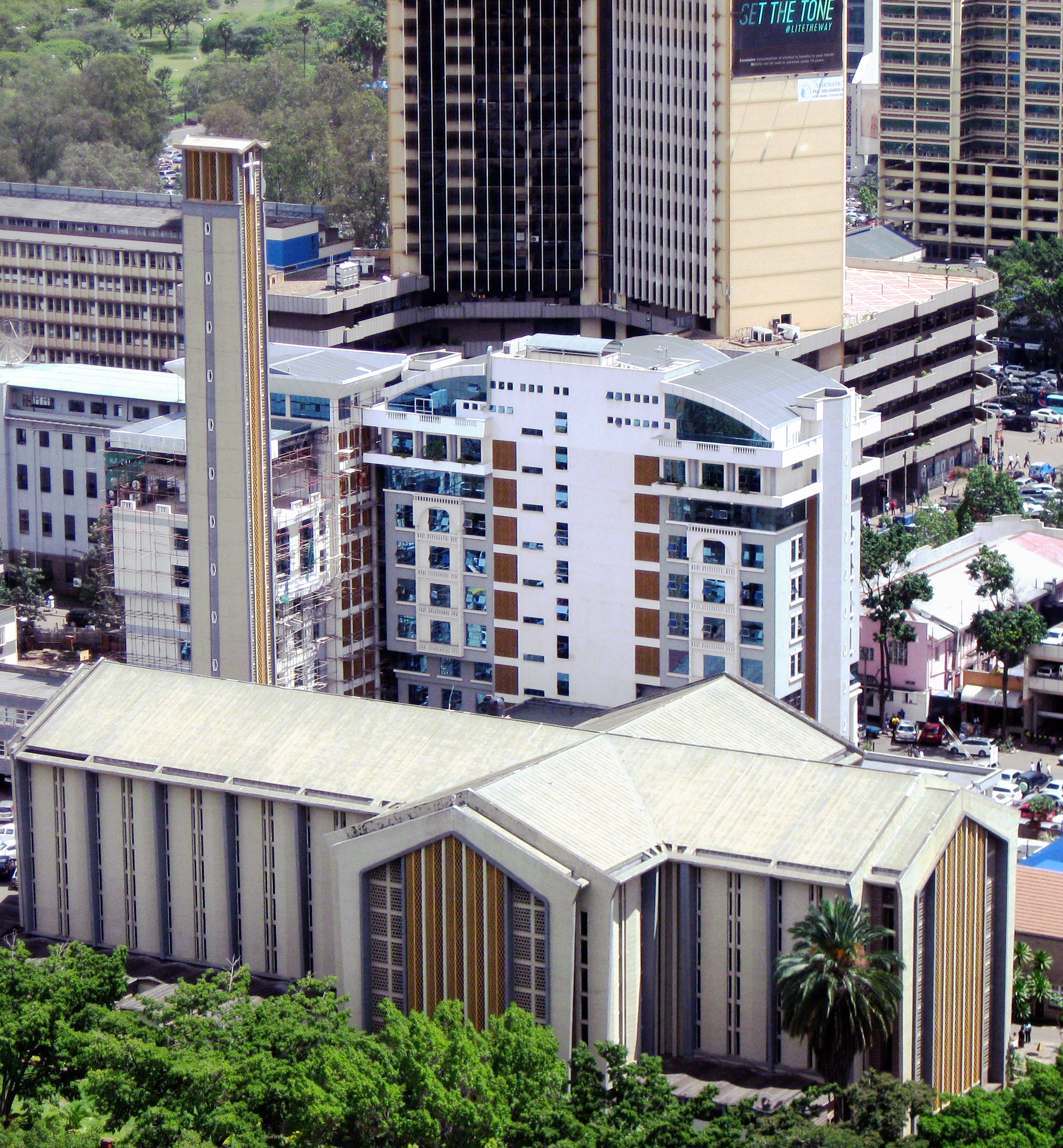
- Holy Family Basilica in Nairobi, Kenya
- Holy Family Minor Basilica
- 1°17′14″S 36°49′13″E
- Location: Nairobi
- Country: Kenya
- Denomination: Roman Catholic
- Website: holyfamilybasilica.info

History
- Status: Active
- Consecrated: 26 December 1982; 43 years ago

Architecture
- Architect: Dorothy Hughes
- Style: Modern
- Years built: 1960–1963
- Groundbreaking: 29 June 1960

Specifications
- Capacity: 3000–4000
- Length: 71.6 metres (235 ft); 40.2 metres (132 ft) (across the transepts)
- Width: 40.2 metres (132 ft) (across the transepts)
- Height: 18.3 metres (60 ft) (walls); 69.9 metres (229 ft) (tower)

Administration
- Archdiocese: Archdiocese of Nairobi

Clergy
- Archbishop: Philip Anyolo

The Cathedral Basilica of the Holy Family is a Catholic Church Cathedral and Basilica dedicated to the Holy Family located in Nairobi. The Basilica is the seat of the Archdiocese of Nairobi. The original church, which had a sitting capacity of 300–400, built in 1904, was Nairobi's first stone building. The current church was built between 1960 and 1963, and was officially blessed and opened on 6 July 1963. The church was designated a basilica in 1982.

== History ==
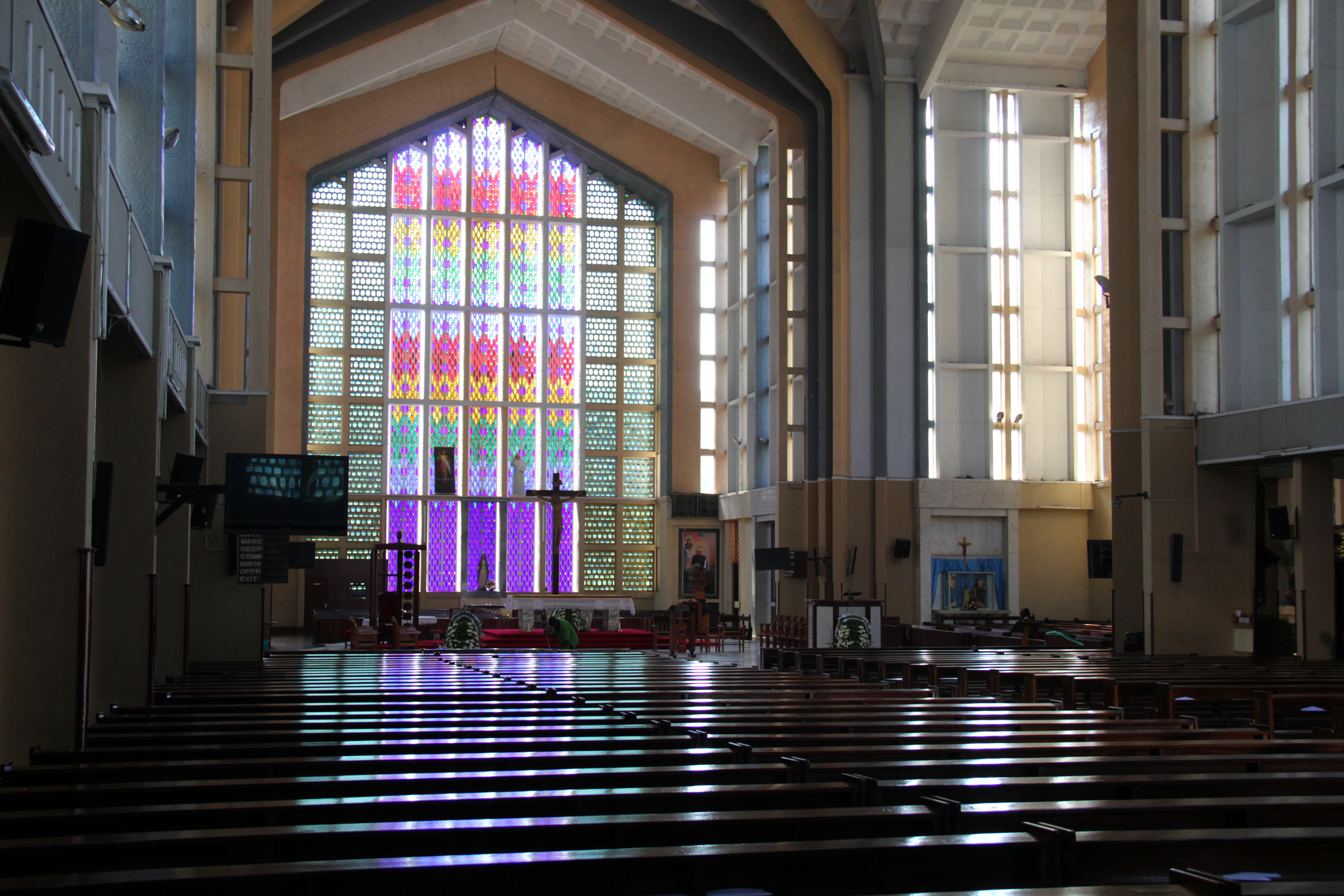
Interior of the cathedral

The congregation of the cathedral was originally composed of railway construction workers who lived in a camp nearby what would become the first Nairobi Railway Station. Under the administration of the Holy Ghost Fathers, Brother Josaphat, C.S.S.P (Holy Ghost Missionary) was entrusted with the building of a church in 1904. With a sitting capacity of 300–400 people, it was the first stone building in Nairobi. The first baptism took place in 1906, the first marriage in 1908, and first confirmation in 1923.

The first Archbishop of Nairobi was John Joseph McCarthy who was appointed in 1953 and he would serve until 1971 when he retired.

Dorothy Hughes, who was brought up in Kenya, designed the current building in 1960. The cathedral was constructed by the British company Mowlem. The modernist cathedral features abstract stained glass in stainless steel frames. The cathedral's specification included details in carrara marble and seating for 3,000 to 4,000 people. This is ten times the number of the original stone church. The building is 98 feet high and features a large cross. Hughes' design features eight different chapels in addition to the two main halls. There is a main altar with a large crucifix and a large sanctuary, as well as two side altars.

The church was visited by John Paul II in 1980 and designated a basilica on 15 February 1982. John Paul prayed again at this church in 1985 and 1995. The Holy Ghost Fathers were responsible for the basilica until 1991.

A new administrative building for the archbishop's office was being built by the Chinese construction company Zhongxing Construction in 2011.

== Services ==
The cathedral is the headquarters of the Archdiocese of Nairobi. The current archbishop is Philip Anyolo who was made a archbishop of Nairobi in 2021. The Archdiocese of Nairobi contains an estimated population of 4 million people of which 1.6 million are thought to be Catholic. These 4,000 Christian communities are served by 182 clergy, eight university level education facilities and several places for retreat.

Services are available throughout the week within the cathedral and one of the chapels is always open. In addition the building also houses a bookshop and a school.

== Gallery ==
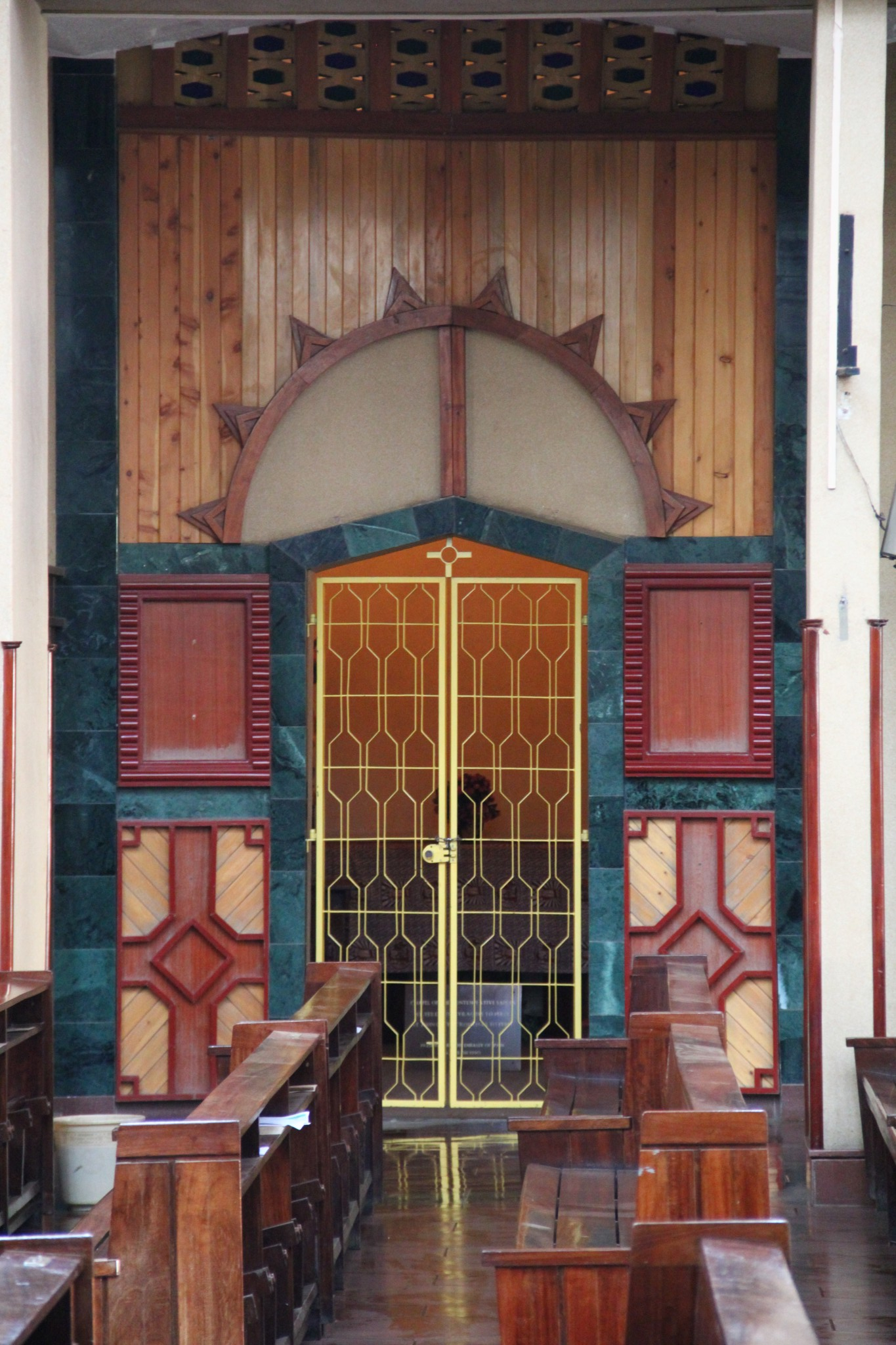
Chapel

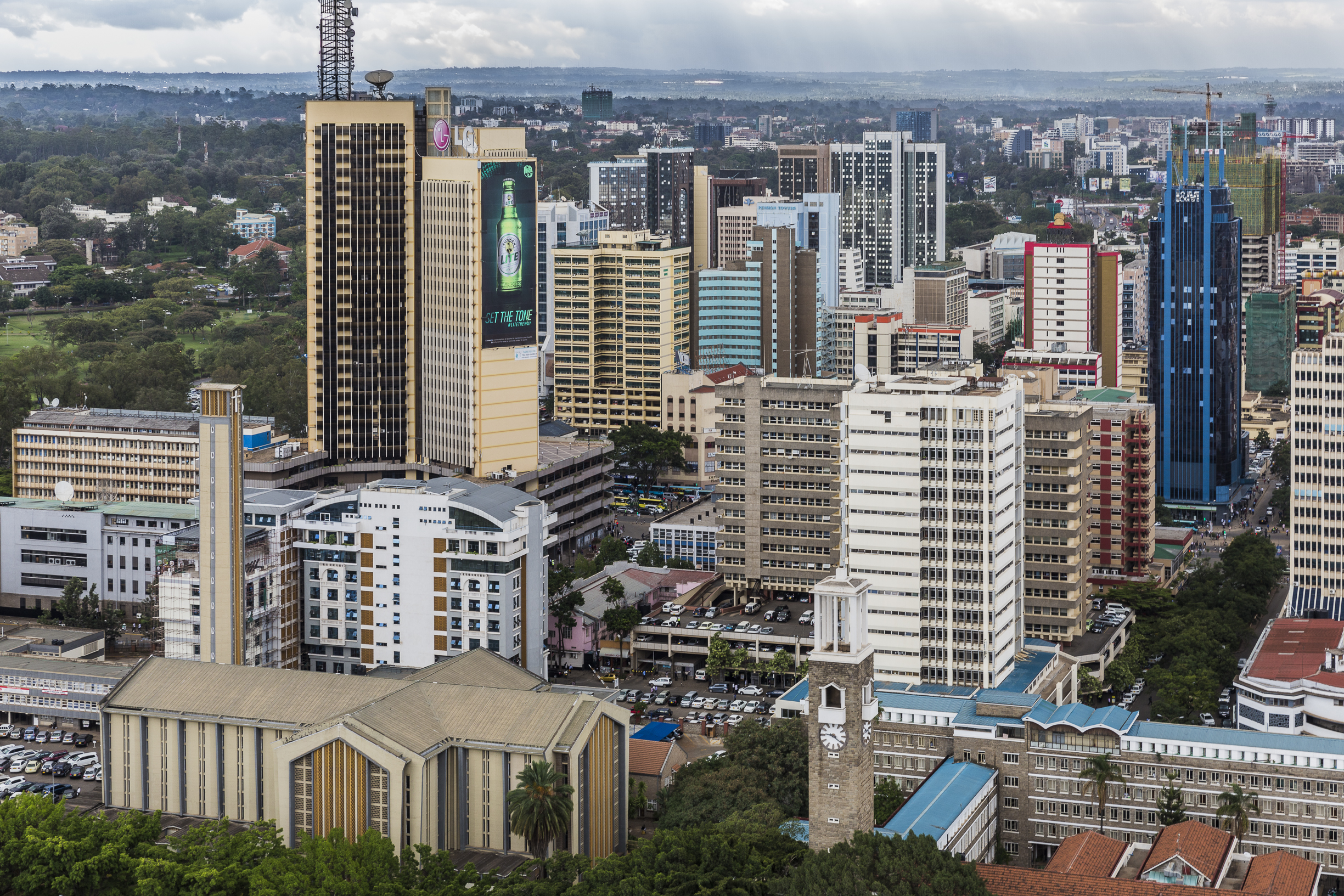
Nairobi city centre including Basilica

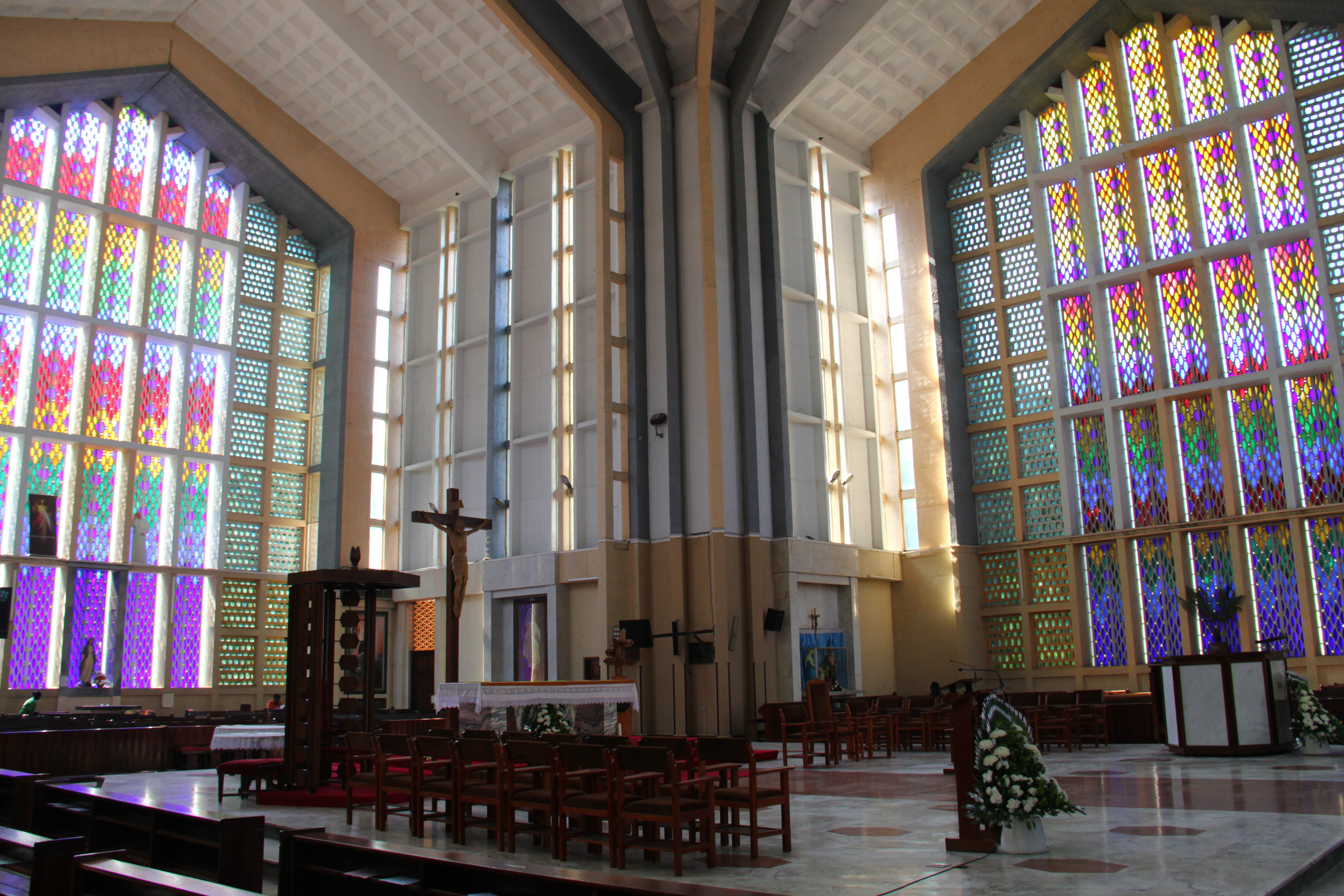
Interior

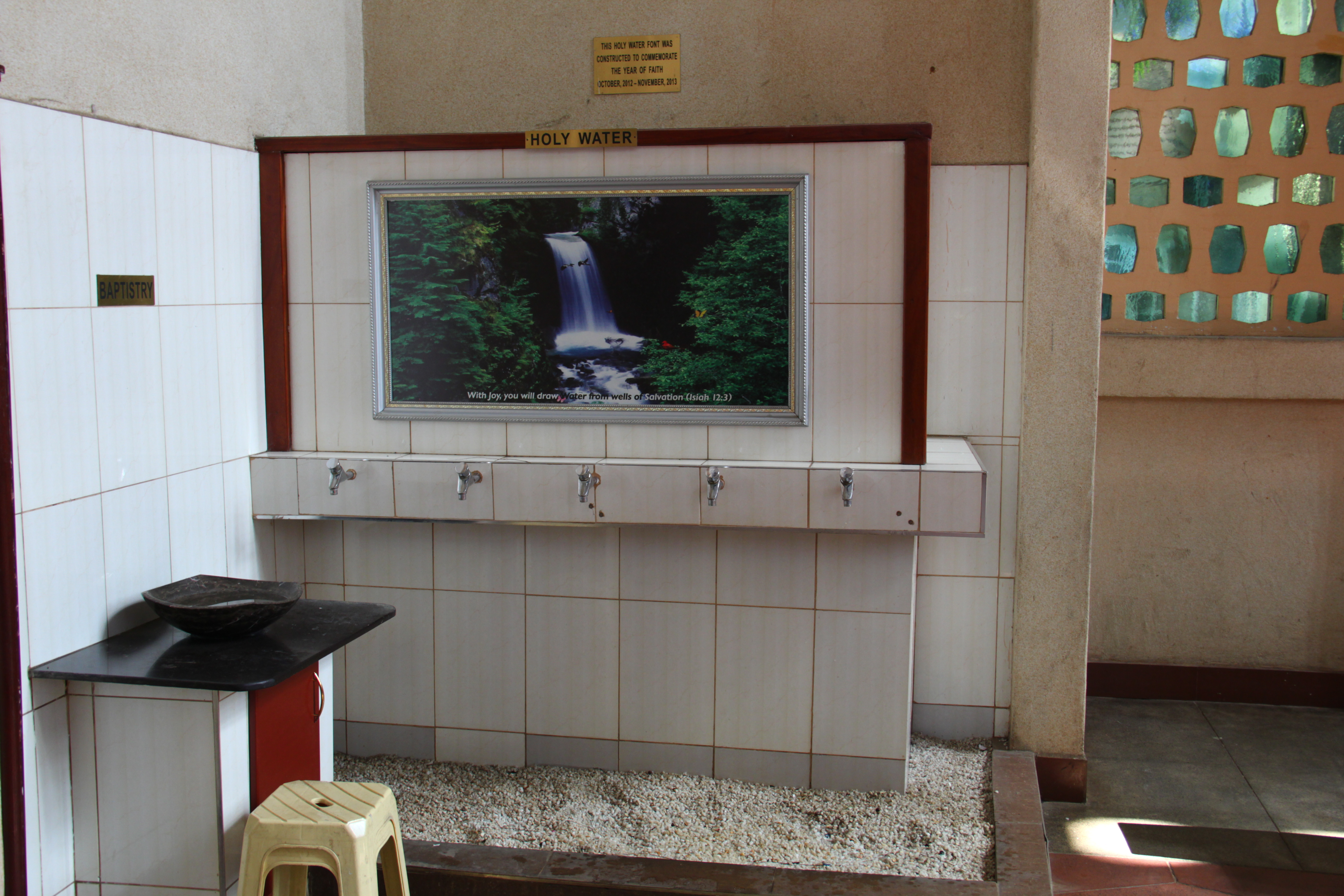
Holy water and baptismal fonts

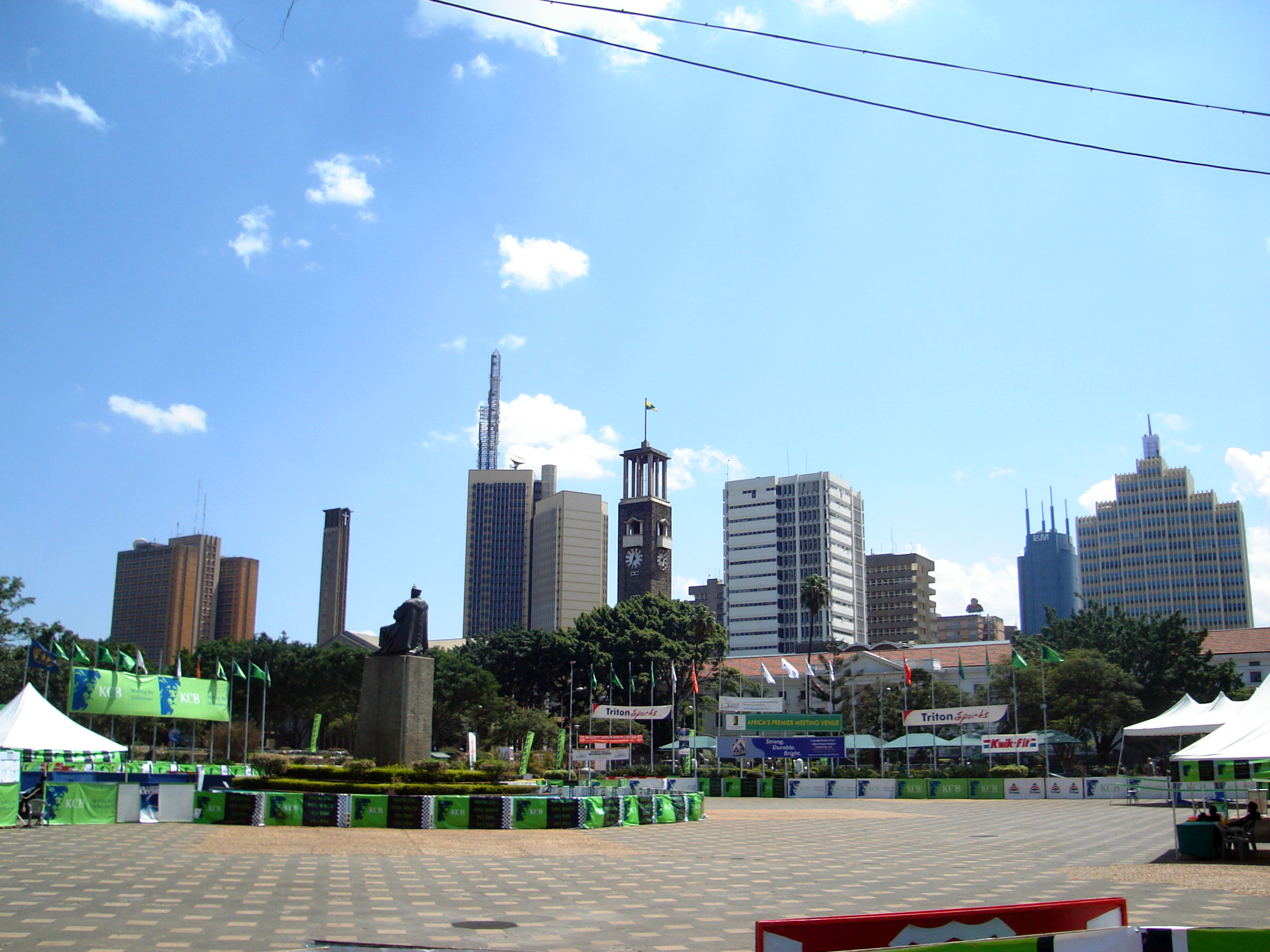
Nairobi from the Kenyatta International Conference Centre
