= Tangaza University =

Private university in Kenya

- Type: Private
- Established: 25 August 1986; 39 years ago
- Religious affiliation: Catholic Church, AMECEA
- Chancellor: Rev. Prof. Edward Etengu
- Vice-Chancellor: Rev. Prof. Patrick Mwania
- Undergraduates: 2,000 (2024)
- Location: Nairobi, Kenya; 01°20′55″S 36°44′56″E
- Campus: Langata South Road, Lang'ata
- Website: https://tangaza.ac.ke/

Tangaza University (TU) is a private university in Kenya. It is a chartered tertiary institution of higher learning, accredited by the Commission for University Education in Kenya.

== Location ==
The university campus is located off Langata South Road, in the neighborhood called Lang'ata, a suburb of Nairobi, approximately 13 kilometres (8 mi) southwest of the city's central business district.

== History ==
The institution opened to students on 25 August 1986, with 20 students, as a constituent college of the adjacently-located Catholic University of Eastern Africa (CUEA). It is owned by the Association of Member Episcopal Conferences in Eastern Africa (AMECEA). The college received official blessing from Cardinal Maurice Michael Otunga, Archbishop of Nairobi on 30 October 1987. On 2 May 2024, the President of Kenya, William Ruto, granted Tangaza University, a university charter. On that day the university separated from the CUEA and became an independent institution.

== Overview ==
As of 2008, the college had 1,206 students enrolled, "with 436 students studying in the School of Theology". By 2024, the student enrollment at the university had increased to 2,000.

== Academics ==
The university is organized in three schools; (a) School of Arts and Social Sciences (b) School of Education and (c) School of Theology. The university also maintains the Institute of Philosophy and the Institute of Spirituality & Religious Formation. Some of the academic programs offered include the following:

- Bachelor of Arts in Leadership and Management
- Bachelor in Education (Arts and Science)
- Bachelor of Arts in Child and Youth Studies
- Bachelor of Arts in Social Communication
- Bachelor of Arts in Sustainable Development
- Bachelor of Arts in Counselling Psychology
- Bachelor of Arts in Youth Ministry
- Bachelor in Education (Science)
- Bachelor of Arts in Theology
- Baccalaureate in Sacred Theology
- Bachelor of Arts in Philosophy
- Bachelor of Commerce (BCom).

The university also offers many courses at diploma and certificate levels, as outlined here.

== Prominent alumni ==
- Bishop Simon Peter Kamomoe. Obtained a Master's degree in Philosophy from here, between 2013 and 2015.
- Bishop Hieronymus Emusugut Joya. Graduated with a Diploma in Theology and a Diploma in Mission Studies in 1998.
- Bishop Obed Muriungi Karobia.
- Bishop George Muthaka. He studied theology here between 1999 and 2003.
- Archbishop George Desmond Tambala. He studied theology here in the 1990s.

== See also ==
- Catholic Church in Kenya
