= Linus Okok Okwach =

Kenyan prelate (1952–2020)

His Lordship, The Right Reverend Linus Okok Okwach
- Church: Roman Catholic Church
- Archdiocese: Roman Catholic Archdiocese of Kisumu
- See: Roman Catholic Diocese of Homa Bay
- Appointed: 18 October 1993
- Term ended: 20 February 2002
- Predecessor: None
- Successor: Philip Arnold Subira Anyolo

Orders
- Ordination: 10 December 1980
- Consecration: 31 December 1993 by Jozef Tomko

Personal details
- Born: Linus Okok Okwach; 20 October 1952; Kisumu, Kisumu County
- Died: 12 September 2020 (aged 67); St Monica Hospital, Kisumu, Kenya

Styles of Linus Okok Okwach
- Reference style: His Lordship; The Most Reverend
- Spoken style: Your Lordship
- Religious style: Bishop

Linus Okok Okwach (20 October 1952 – 12 September 2020), was a Kenyan Roman Catholic prelate who served as Bishop of the Roman Catholic Diocese of Homa Bay. He was appointed as bishop of Homa Bay on 18 October 1993 and he resigned on 20 February 2002.

== Background and priesthood ==
Okwach was born on 20 October 1952 in the city of Kisumu, in the Roman Catholic Archdiocese of Kisumu, in present-day Kisumu County. He was ordained a priest on 10 December 1980. He served as a priest of the Archdiocese of Kisumu until 18 October 1993.

== As bishop ==
Father Okwach was appointed Bishop of the Roman Catholic Diocese of Homa Bay on 18 October 1993. He was the first Ordinary of the newly created diocese, and was consecrated a bishop at Homa Bay on 31 December 1993 by Cardinal Jozef Tomko, Cardinal-Deacon of Gesù Buon Pastore alla Montagnola, assisted by Archbishop Clemente Faccani, Titular Archbishop of Serra, and Archbishop Zacchaeus Okoth, Archbishop of Kisumu. Bishop Okwach resigned as Bishop of Homa Bay on 20 February 2002.

== Illness and death ==
Bishop Emeritus Okwach fell down at his residence in 2019 and injured his back. He never stood up or walked again after the fall. Three weeks before his death, Bishop Okwach was admitted to St Monica Hospital in Kisumu on account of complications of his illness. He died in hospital on 12 September 2020. He was laid to rest at St Paul's Cathedral in Homa Bay on 30 September 2020.

Catholic Church titles
Preceded by None (Before 1993)	Bishop of Homa Bay; 1993 – 2002	Succeeded by Philip Arnold Subira Anyolo (2003 – 2018)
