= Kenya Conference of Catholic Bishops =

Assembly of Catholic bishops

The Kenya Conference of Catholic Bishops (KCCB) is the assembly of bishops of the Catholic Church in Kenya. Its statutes were approved by the Holy See on December 7, 1976.

== Structure ==
The plenary sessions of the KCCB are attended by all the diocesan bishops, emeritus and auxiliary bishops, the apostolic vicar, and the military chaplaincy. The Conference accomplishes its mission through the Catholic Secretariat which, through the Episcopal Commissions, coordinates and implements the decisions of the plenary assembly, providing the appropriate technical support. Currently, there are 15 committees reporting to the KCCB: liturgy, doctrine, lay apostolate, mission, justice and peace, ecumenism, interreligious dialogue, refugees, and others. There are also two sub-committees (canon law and apostolate of the nomads).

== Regional bodies ==
The KCCB is a member of the Association of Member Episcopal Conferences in Eastern Africa (AMECEA) and Symposium of Episcopal Conferences of Africa and Madagascar (SECAM).

== Presidents ==
1969–1970: John Joseph McCarthy, the Archbishop of Nairobi

1970–1976: Maurice Michael Otunga, Cardinal, Archbishop of Nairobi

1976–1982: John Njenga, bishop of Eldoret

1982–1988: Raphael Ndingi Mwana'a Nzeki, Bishop of Nakuru

1988–1991: Nicodemus Kirima, Archbishop of Nyeri

1991–1997: Zacchaeus Okoth, Archbishop of Kisumu

1997–2003: John Njue, Bishop of Embu

2003–2006: Cornelius Arap Korir Kipng'eno, Bishop of Eldoret

2006–2015: John Njue, Cardinal, Archbishop of Nairobi

2015– : Philip Arnold Subira Anyolo, Bishop of Homa Bay
