= David Kamau Ng'ang'a =

Kenyan Catholic prelate

The Most Reverend David Kamau Ng'ang'a
- Auxiliary Bishop of Nairobi
- Church: Catholic Church
- Archdiocese: Roman Catholic Archdiocese of Nairobi
- See: Nairobi
- Appointed: 22 December 1999

Orders
- Ordination: 10 January 1982
- Consecration: 18 March 2000 by Cardinal Jozef Tomko
- Rank: Bishop

Personal details
- Born: David Kamau Ng'ang'a; 1955 (age 69–70); Kiambu, Kiambu County, Kenya

Styles of David Kamau Ng'ang'a
- Reference style: The Most Reverend
- Religious style: Bishop

David Kamau Ng'ang'a (born in 1955) is a Kenyan Catholic bishop who serves as Auxiliary Bishop of the Roman Catholic Archdiocese of Nairobi. He was appointed Auxiliary Bishop of Nairobi on 22 December 1999, by Pope John Paul II.

== Background and education ==
He was born in 1955, in Kiambu County, in the Archdiocese of Nairobi, Kenya. He attended elementary school at Ikinu Primary School, in his home area, from 1964 until 1970. He studied at Queen of Apostles Seminary for his secondary studies from 1971 until 1974. He then joined St. Augustine Seminary, Mabanga in 1975, where he studied philosophy. After that, he studied Theology at St. Thomas Aquinas Seminary, in Nairobi.

== Priest ==
He was ordained a priest on 10 January 1982. As priest of the archdiocese of Nairobi, he served in several roles inside and outside the diocese. He served as a Priest of Nairobi Archdiocese until 22 December 1999.

Among the tasks assigned to him as priest of Nairobi included as Parish priest at Our Lady of Visitation Makadara Parish. He also served as the Rector of St. Augustine Senior Seminary Mabanga, in Mabanga, Bungoma, Kenya.

== As bishop ==
Father David Kamau Ng'ang'a was appointed Auxiliary Bishop of the Roman Catholic Archdiocese of Nairobi on 22 December 1999 and received contemporaneous appointment as Titular Bishop of Oëa. He received episcopal consecration at the Nyayo National Stadium, Nairobi, in the archdiocese of Nairobi, on 18 March 2000. The Principal Consecrator was Cardinal Jozef Tomko, Cardinal-Priest of Santa Sabina, assisted by Archbishop Giovanni Tonucci, Titular Archbishop of Torcello and Archbishop Raphael Simon Ndingi Mwana'a Nzeki, Archbishop of Nairobi

While Auxiliary Bishop of Nairobi, he served as the Apostolic Administrator of Nairobi, Kenya from 4 January 2021 until 20 November 2021. He also served as the Apostolic Administrator of Nakuru, Kenya from 19 March 2022 until 6 May 2023. As of 2020, he served as the Chairman of the Commission for Clergy and Religious of the Liaison Committee of the Kenya Conference of Catholic Bishops (KCCB).

== See also ==
- Catholic Church in Kenya

== Succession table ==
Catholic Church titles
Unknown	Auxiliary Bishop of Nairobi (Since 22 December 1999)	Succeeded by Incumbent
Titular church created	Titular Bishop of Oëa; 22 December 1999 –	Incumbent
