= Dorothy Hughes (architect) =

Kenyan architect, politician, social reformer and disability activist

- Born: Eugenie Dorothy Ullmann; 26 June 1910; London, England
- Died: 16 August 1987 (aged 77); Tunbridge Wells, County Kent, England, Buried at Muthangari, Nairobi Kenya.
- Occupations: Architect, politician

Eugenie Dorothy Hughes, MBE, FRIBA (26 June 1910 – 16 August 1987) was a Kenyan architect, politician, social reformer and disability activist. She founded the Kenyan Council of Social Services and served as the head of the Sports Association for the Disabled. As the first East African female architect, she owned her own firm and is best known for her design of the Cathedral of the Holy Family in Nairobi.

== Biography ==
Eugenie Dorothy Ullmann was born on 26 June 1910 in London. Her parents moved to the Rift Valley town of Eldoret in Uasin Gishu County, in 1913, constructing the second building in that town. She grew up in Kenya but returned to London for schooling, attending the Architectural Association School of Architecture. She returned to Kenya and married the Kenyan Ford agent, John Hughes, who later founded Hughes Motors. Subsequently, the couple had 6 children.

Hughes became a Fellow of the Royal Institute of British Architects in 1946. She opened an architectural firm, Hughes and Polkinghorne, designing such structures as the Golden Beach Hotel, Murangi House, the Princess Elizabeth Hospital, the Rift Valley Sports Club, and St. Mary's School, Nairobi, among many others. In 1950, she was awarded Most Excellent Order of the British Empire (MBE) for her design work on the hospitals in Kenya, like the Nakuru War Memorial Hospital. Between 1950 and 1951 Hughes served as vice president of the East Africa Women's League, which was formed to promote an initiative and collect funds to address the hospital shortage in Nairobi; she subsequently served as president for the 1951-1952 term.

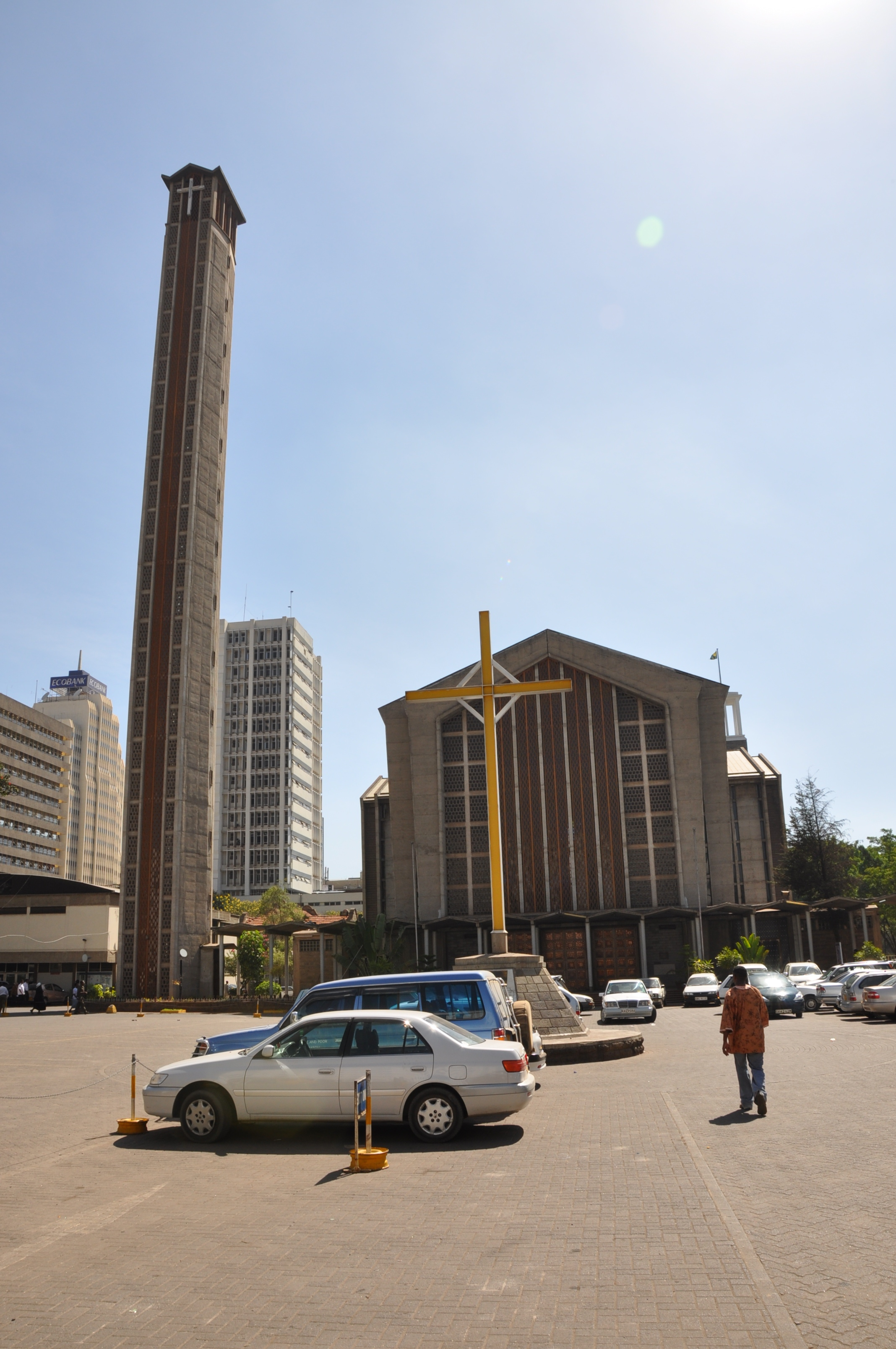
Her noted design for Nairobi's Cathedral of the Holy Family

In 1955 Hughes was elected to serve on the Nairobi City Council and was elected by the mostly Afrikaner constituency in 1956 to represent the Uasin Gishu settlers on the Legislative Council. In 1959, she was selected as the delegate to the 1960 Lancaster House Conference in London to secure Kenyan independence. Hughes lost her seat in the 1961 elections primarily because of her Catholicism and membership in the New Kenya Party. The primary was only open to white settlers, the constituency which had previously elected her was mostly non-white, and the New Kenya Party was the first multi-racial party in Kenya. After the loss of the election, Hughes turned her sights to community social welfare projects such as the Cheshire Homes for disabled people. Hughes served as vice chair of the organizing committee for the International Conference on Social Welfare held in Nairobi in July, 1974 and was a founding member of the Kenyan Council of Social Services. She also served as chair of the Kenya Sports Association for the Disabled.

Hughes' most noted design work was of the Cathedral of the Holy Family which she designed in 1960. Known for its modernist style and non-figurative stained glass, the building also featured carrara marble and seating for 4,000. In addition to the main altar, there are two side altars, two halls and eight chapels. It currently serves as the headquarters of the Archdiocese of Nairobi. In the late 1960s, she designed an annex to the Kenya Tea Development Agency (KTDA) which held a popular flying saucer-shaped nightclub known for its local benga music, as well as Afro-Caribbean calypso and soukous rhythms. The club, located in the red-light district of Nairobi on Koinange Street, went through various name changes but was locally known as the F1, Madhouse, or Maddi, until its 2014 demolition. Both of these buildings were listed by the Daily Nation in the list of top buildings in Kenya.

Late in life, Hughes donated her home in Mũthangari, in the Lavington area of Nairobi to the organization Opus Dei as the permanent home of Kibondeni College. She had worked with the members of Opus Dei for many years to establish educational opportunities for girls in Nairobi. She died on 16 August 1987 in Tunbridge Wells, Kent, England and was buried in St. Austin's Cemetery, Mũthangari, Nairobi, Kenya.

== Sources ==
- Gichure, Christine (2011). "The Beginnings of Kibondeni College, Nairobi. A Historical and Sociological Overview" (PDF). (Studia et Documenta) SetD. 5. Pamplona, Spain: Universidad de Navarra. ISSN 1970-4879.
- Kenya Gazette (22 February 1955). General Notice 451: City Council of Nairobi. Nairobi, Kenya.
- Kenya Gazette (5 September 1958). Electoral Area No. 1—Nairobi North.
- Kenya Gazette (11 December 1987). Cause #955 of 1987. Nairobi, Kenya.
