= Preziosissimo Sangue di Nostro Signore Gesù Cristo =

Preziossimo Sangue di Nostro Signore Gesú Cristo
- Church of the Most Blessed Blood of Our Lord Jesus Christ (in English); Pretiossimo Saguinis Domini Nostræ Iesu Christi (in Latin)
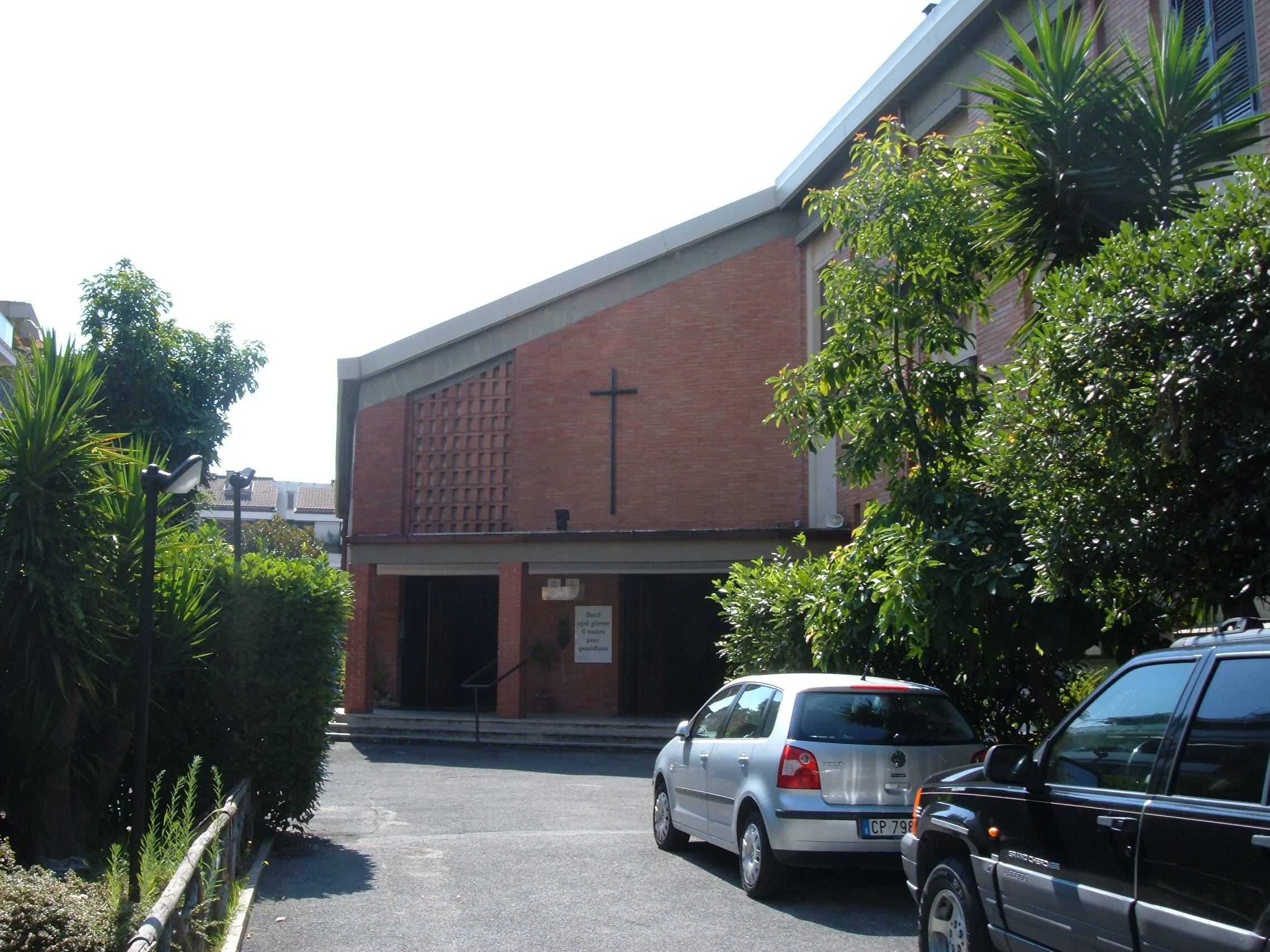
- Facade
- Click on the map for a fullscreen view
- 41°56′46″N 12°28′27″E
- Location: Via Flaminia 732T, Rome
- Country: Italy
- Denomination: Roman Catholic
- Tradition: Roman Rite

History
- Status: Titular church
- Dedication: Blood of Christ

Architecture
- Architectural type: Church
- Groundbreaking: 1957

Administration
- District: Lazio
- Province: Rome

The church of the Most Precious Blood of Our Lord Jesus Christ is a place of Catholic worship in Rome, seat of the parish, in the Tor di Quinto neighborhood, in Via Flaminia.

== History ==
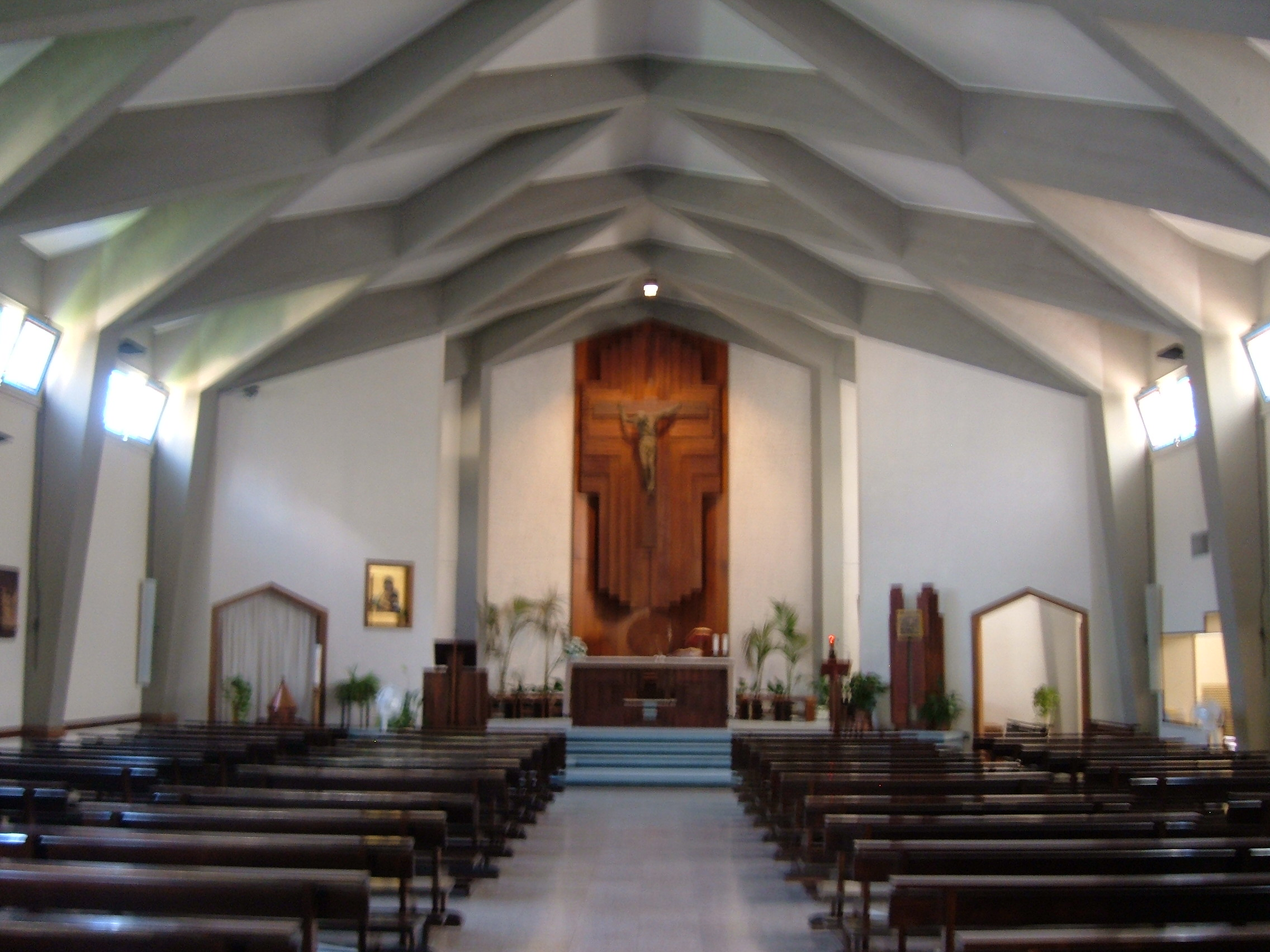
Interior

The parish was erected October 22, 1957, with the decree of the Cardinal Vicar Clemente Micara "Etsi antistitem" and belongs to the Prefecture XIII. The parish was visited by Pope John Paul II, who celebrated the Mass on 17 October 1993. Pope Benedict XVI established it as cardinal title of Preziossimo Sangue di Nostro Signore Gesú Cristo with John Njue as its first and incumbent cardinal-protector since 2007.

== Cardinal Priest ==
Pope Benedict XVI established it as titular church since 24 November 2007.

- John Njue, 24 November 2007 appointed - present
