= Diocese of Wote =

Roman Catholic diocese in Kenya

Diocese of Wote Dioecesis Votensis

Location
- Country: Kenya
- Ecclesiastical province: Province of Nairobi
- Metropolitan: Nairobi

Statistics
- Area: 8,009 km^{2} (3,092 sq mi)
- Population: Total; Catholics: 987,653; 388,946 (39.38%)
- Parishes: 31
- Schools: 200

Information
- Denomination: Roman Catholic
- Rite: Roman Rite
- Established: July 22, 2023; 3 years ago
- Cathedral: Saint Joseph the Worker Cathedral in Wote
- Secular priests: 90

Current leadership
- Pope: Leo XIV
- Bishop: Simon Peter Kamomoe
- Bishops emeritus: Paul Kariuki Njiru

The Roman Catholic Diocese of Wote (Latin: Dioecesis Votensis) is a diocese of the Roman Catholic Church in Kenya.

== History ==
On 22 July 2023 the diocese was established from the diocesan territories of Machakos and was made a suffragan diocese of the Roman Catholic Archdiocese of Nairobi.

== Bishops ==
- Bishops of Wote (Roman rite)
  - Bishop Simon Peter Kamomoe (since 13 May 2026)
  - Bishop Paul Kariuki Njiru, (22 July 2023 to 25 March 2026, resigned)

=== Auxiliary Bishops ===
- Simon Peter Kamomoe (5 July 2025 to 13 May 2026, appointed Local Ordinary)

== See also ==
- Roman Catholicism in Kenya
