= Roman Catholic Diocese of Kericho =

Roman Catholic diocese in Kenya

Coordinates: 0.3645°S 35.2898°E

Diocese of Kericho Dioecesis Kerichoensis
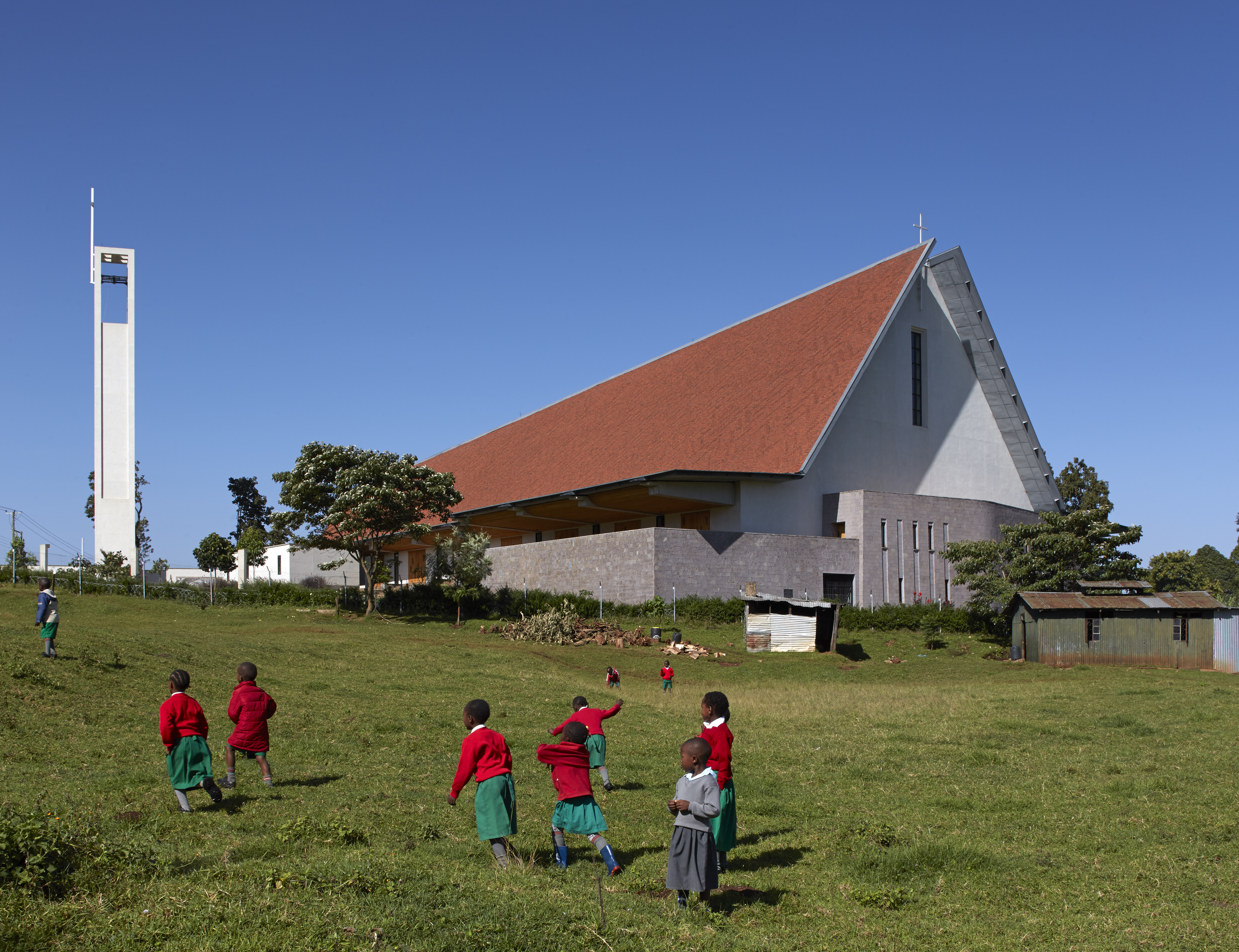
- Sacred Heart Cathedral

Location
- Country: Kenya
- Metropolitan: Nairobi

Statistics
- Area: 4,800 km^{2} (1,900 sq mi)
- Population: Total; Catholics: (as of 2004); 1,554,850; 223,856 (14.4%)

Information
- Sui iuris church: Latin Church
- Rite: Roman Rite
- Cathedral: Sacred Heart Cathedral

Current leadership
- Pope: Leo XIV
- Bishop: Alfred Kipkoech Arap Rotich
- Bishops emeritus: Emmanuel Wandera Okombo

The Roman Catholic Diocese of Kericho (Latin: Kerichoën(sis)) is a diocese located in the city of Kericho in the ecclesiastical province of Nairobi in Kenya.

== History ==
- December 5, 1995: Established as Diocese of Kericho from the Diocese of Nakuru. The Diocese has 48 parishes with various religious institutions, congregations, schools, hospitals, health centers, projects and programmes.

== Leadership ==
- Bishops of Kericho (Latin Church)
  - Philip Arnold Subira Anyolo (December 6, 1995 – March 22, 2003), appointed Bishop of Homa Bay
  - Emmanuel Wandera Okombo (March 23, 2003 - December 13, 2019) Bishop Emertus
  - Alfred Kipkoech Arap Rotich (Since December 14, 2019)

== See also ==
- Roman Catholicism in Kenya
