= Military Ordinariate of Kenya =

Latin Catholic ecclesiastical jurisdiction in Kenya

Military Ordinariate of Kenya Ordinariatus Militaris Kenia

Location
- Country: Kenya

Information
- Denomination: Catholic Church
- Sui iuris church: Latin Church
- Rite: Roman Rite
- Established: 20 January 1964 (62 years ago)

Current leadership
- Pope: Leo XIV
- Bishop: Wallace Ng'ang'a Gachihi

The Military Ordinariate of Kenya is a Latin Church ecclesiastical jurisdiction or military ordinariate of the Catholic Church. Immediately exempt to the Holy See, it provides pastoral care to Catholics serving in the Kenyan Armed Forces and their families.

== History ==
When Kenya became independent in 1963, the Government of the Republic of Kenya adopted the British tradition of having Chaplaincy in the Kenya Defence Forces which is composed of the Kenya Army, the Kenya Air Force and the Kenya Navy. The chaplaincy was entrusted with the responsibility of religious administration of the Kenya Defence Forces Personnel, their families and dependents.

The Military Ordinariate of Kenya was established as a Military Vicariate on 20 January 1964 and Maurice Michael Cardinal Otunga was appointed the first Military Vicar on the same date. On 24 July 1981, Pope John Paul II established the Military Vicariate in Kenya officially. On 21 July 1986, Maurice Michael Cardinal Otunga became the first Ordinary of the Military Ordinariate of Kenya.

Although the Military Vicariate existed since 20 January 1964, it was not registered with Government of Kenya till 15 December 1986 after its elevation to a Military Ordinariate on 21 July 1986. Maurice Michael Cardinal Otunga served the Military Ordinariate as an Ordinary up to 29 August 1997. Col (Rtd) Bishop Alfred Kipkoech Arap Rotich was appointed as the Military Ordinariate of Kenya Bishop on 29 August 1997 and served up to 30 December 2016. Col Dr (Msgr) Benjamin K Maswili was appointed the Apostolic Administrator of the Military Ordinariate of Kenya on 30 December 2016.

The Military Ordinariate has grown over the years from Vicariate to Ordinariate. The number of Chaplains and Catechist has increased and thus spiritual and Pastoral care growth.

== Office holders ==
=== Military Vicars ===
- Bishop Maurice Michael Otunga (appointed 20 January 1964 – became Military Ordinary 21 July 1986) (concurrent with this appointment, became Archbishop, later Cardinal); see below

=== Military Ordinaries ===
- Cardinal Maurice Michael Otunga (appointed 21 July 1986 – retired 29 August 1997); see above
- Alfred Kipkoech Arap Rotich (appointed 29 August 1997 - retired 30 December 2016)
- Wallace Ng'ang'a Gachihi (appointed 15 August 2024 - installed 12 October 2024)

=== Monsignor ===
- Msgr Benjamin Kituto Maswili (appointed Apostolic Administrator on 30 December 2016 - to date)
