= John Joseph McCarthy =

Irish archbishop

Archbishop Emeritus John Joseph McCarthy
- Archbishop Emeritus of Nairobi
- Church: Roman Catholic Church
- Archdiocese: Nairobi
- Metropolis: Nairobi
- See: Nairobi
- Appointed: 25 March 1953
- Term ended: 24 October 1971
- Successor: Maurice Michael Otunga
- Other post: President of Kenya Conference of Catholic Bishops (1969–1970)
- Previous posts: Vicar Apostolic of Zanzibar(1946–1953); Titular Bishop of Cercina (1946–1953)

Orders
- Ordination: 24 June 1925

Personal details
- Born: John Joseph McCarthy; 28 April 1896 Doonegan, Milltown Malbay, County Clare, Ireland
- Died: 13 January 1983 (aged 86) Kimmage Manor, Dublin, Ireland
- Denomination: Roman Catholic
- Education: University College Dublin

Ordination history of John Joseph McCarthy
History
Episcopal consecration
- Principal consecrator: Archbishop David James Mathew
- Co-consecrators: Bishop Joseph Nikabaale Kiwanuka + Bishop Bernhard Gerhard Hilhorst

Bishop John Joseph "J.J." McCarthy C.S.Sp. (27 April 1896 – 13 January 1983), was an Irish born, Holy Ghost Father, who served as Bishop to Nairobi, Kenya.

Born 28 April 1896 in Doonegan, Milltown Malbay, County Clare, 'J.J' was a student at Rockwell College, before going on to Kimmage Manor to train as a priest. He studied at St. Marys, and University College Dublin (obtaining a BA), and was a prefect in Blackrock College. At Rockwell, he played rugby and also played rugby in Blackrock. He was ordained in 1925, and following ordination, he went on his mission to East Africa.

He was ordained bishop in 1946 with the old title of Vicar Apostolic of Zanzibar (succeeding another Irish Spiritan John William Heffernan) and Titular Bishop of Cercina. In 1953 he was appointed Archbishop of Nairobi, and position he held until his retirement in 1971.

He served as president of the Kenya Conference of Catholic Bishops from 1969 to 1970.

He retired in 1972 and returned to Ireland, where he lived in Kildare for a time before moving to Kimmage Manor, where he died in 1983.
