= Diocese of Homa Bay =

Roman Catholic diocese in Kenya

Coordinates: 0.5252°S 34.4642°E

Diocese of Homa Bay Dioecesis Homa Bayensis

Location
- Country: Kenya
- Metropolitan: Kisumu

Statistics
- Area: 7,778 km^{2} (3,003 sq mi)
- Population: Total; Catholics: 1,970,000; 368,136 (18.7%)

Information
- Rite: Latin Rite

Current leadership
- Pope: Leo XIV
- Bishop: Michael Cornelius Otieno Odiwa

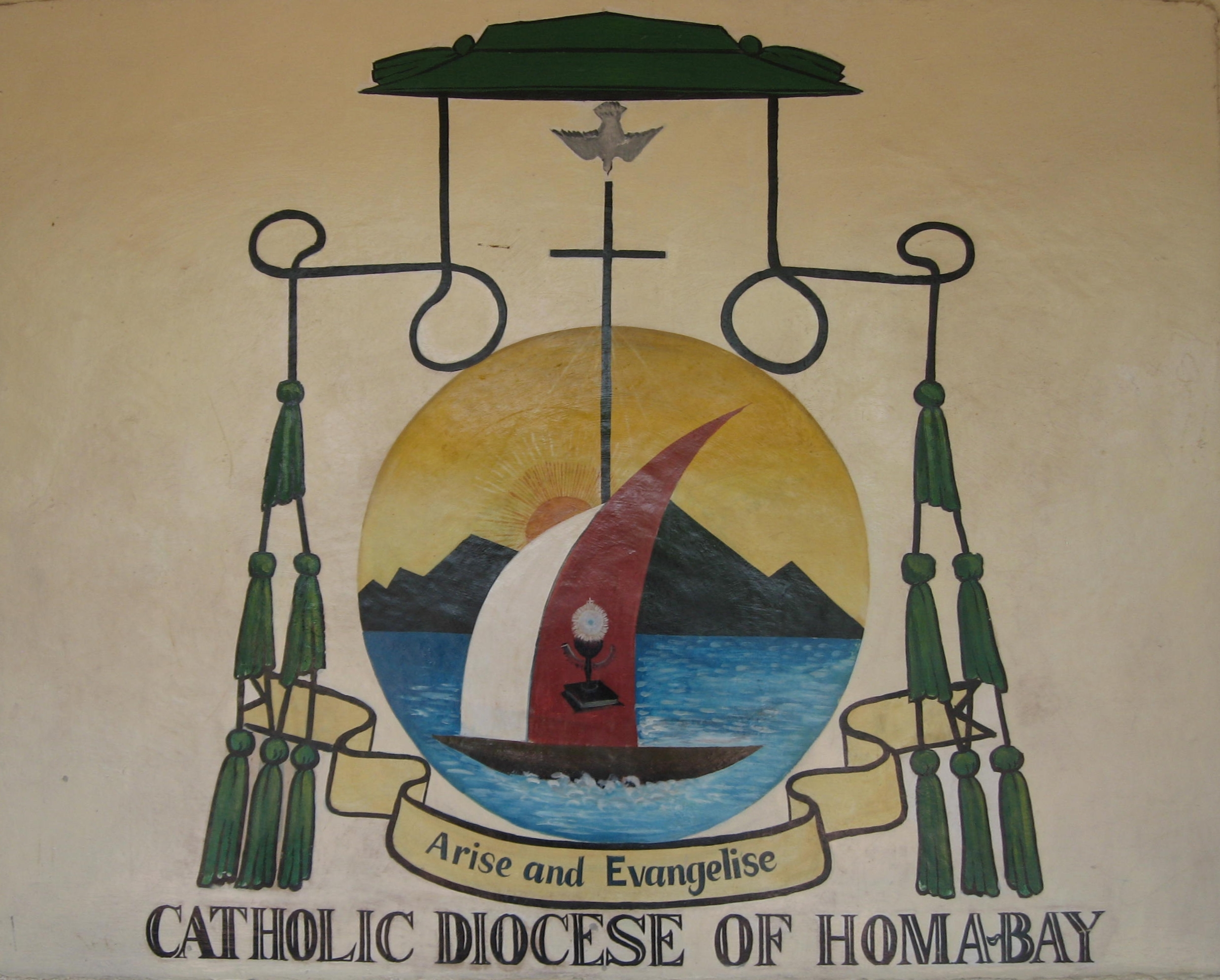
Coat of arms of the Diocese of Homa Bay, Kenya

The Roman Catholic Diocese of Homa Bay (Latin: Homa Bayen(sis)) is a diocese located in the city of Homa Bay in the ecclesiastical province of Kisumu in Kenya.

== History ==
- October 18, 1993: Established as Diocese of Homa Bay from the Diocese of Kisii

== Leadership ==
- Bishops of Homa Bay (Roman rite)
  - Bishop Linus Okok Okwach (18 Oct 1993 – 20 Feb 2002)
  - Bishop Philip Arnold Subira Anyolo (22 Mar 2003 – 15 Nov 2019), appointed Archbishop of Kisumu
  - Bishop Michael Cornelius Otieno Odiwa (Nov 2020 – )

== See also ==
- Roman Catholicism in Kenya
- Kenya Conference of Catholic Bishops

== Sources ==
- GCatholic.org
- Catholic Hierarchy
- Homa Bay Partnership with the Diocese of St. Cloud
