= Raphael S. Ndingi Mwana a'Nzeki =

Kenyan archbishop (1931–2020)

The Most Reverend Raphael S. Ndingi Mwana a'Nzeki
- Archbishop emeritus of Nairobi
- Church: Roman Catholic Church
- Archdiocese: Nairobi
- Metropolis: Nairobi
- See: Nairobi
- Appointed: 21 April 1997
- Term ended: 6 October 2007
- Predecessor: Maurice Michael Otunga
- Successor: John Njue
- Previous posts: Bishop of Machakos (1969–71); Bishop of Nakuru (1971–97)

Orders
- Ordination: 31 January 1961 by John Joseph McCarthy
- Consecration: 1 August 1969 by Pope Paul VI

Personal details
- Born: Raphael Simon Ndingi Mwana a'Nzeki; 25 December 1931 Mwala, Machakos, Kenya
- Died: 30 March 2020 (aged 88)

Ordination history of Raphael S. Ndingi Mwana a'Nzeki
History
Priestly ordination
- Ordained by: John Joseph McCarthy

Raphael S. Ndingi Mwana a'Nzeki (25 December 1931 — 30 March 2020) was a Kenyan bishop of the Roman Catholic Church who served as archbishop of the Roman Catholic Archdiocese of Nairobi in Kenya. He also served as the bishop of Machakos and Nakuru.

== Life ==
Ndingi was born in the Mwala location in then Machakos district in colonial Kenya. He joined Kiserian Seminary after completing his primary school education. Ndingi sat for the Cambridge School Certificate privately and returned excellent results. He was then admitted to St. John Fisher College in New York, USA, where he pursued a BA degree in political science and history. He was ordained as a priest in 1961 and served under Archbishop J. J. McCarthy of the Nairobi diocese. He was ordained as a bishop in 1969 and served in that capacity in the dioceses of Machakos and Nakuru before being appointed as Coadjutor Archbishop of Nairobi in 1996 as an assistant to Cardinal Maurice Michael Otunga. He succeeded Cardinal Otunga on 21 April 1997 as the Archbishop of Nairobi. He was retired by Pope Benedict XVI on 6 October 2007 after attaining the age of 75 years. He was succeeded by the current Cardinal John Njue who was his assistant in Nakuru.

== Struggle for multiparty democracy ==
Ndingi was one of the clergy who played an active role in the struggle for the reintroduction of multiparty democracy in Kenya. Although he was a moderate who tried avoiding inciting the public against the government, the atrocities committed by the repressive Daniel arap Moi regime forced him to publicly condemn the authorities. He is best remembered for opposing the KANU government's directive that forced voters to queue behind their preferred candidate (Mlolongo) and his confrontation of the provincial administration and the police for their role in political clashes of 1992 when 2,000 people are reported to have died.

== Death ==
The archbishop died in Nairobi on 30 March 2020 after a long illness. His death was announced by Cardinal John Njue, urging people to "pray for the repose of his soul". President Uhuru Kenyatta eulogized Ndingi as a "truth soldier" and a "loving man".
