= John Njue =

Kenyan cardinal

His Eminence John Njue
- Cardinal, Archbishop Emeritus of Nairobi
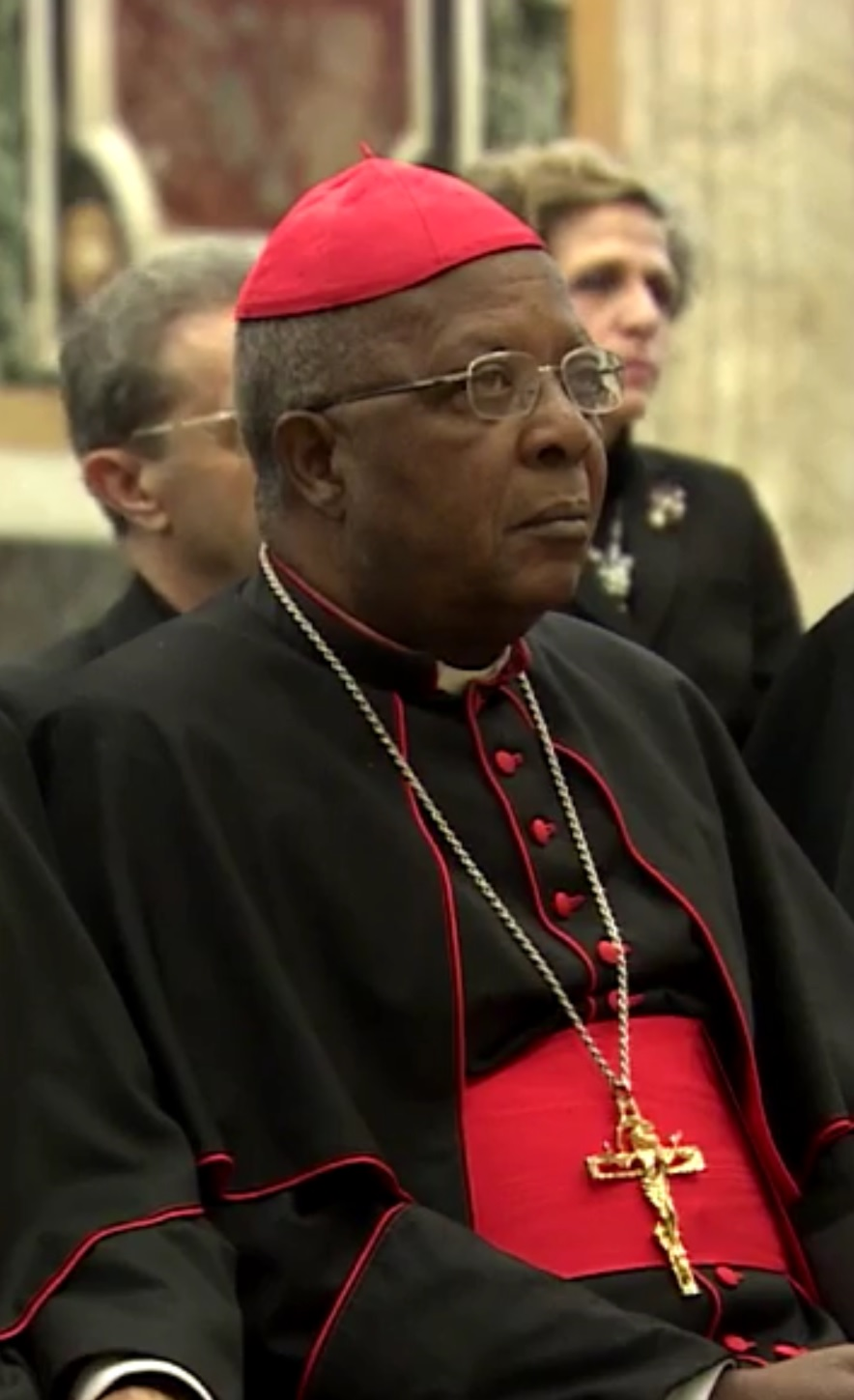
- Njue in 2017
- See: Nairobi
- Appointed: 6 October 2007
- Installed: 1 November 2007
- Term ended: 4 January 2021
- Predecessor: Raphael S. Ndingi Mwana a'Nzeki
- Successor: Philip Anyolo
- Other post: Cardinal Priest of Preziosissimo Sangue di Nostro Signore Gesù Cristo
- Previous posts: Bishop of Embu (1986–2002); Coadjutor Archbishop of Nyeri (2002–2007); Archbishop of Nairobi (2007–2021)

Orders
- Ordination: 6 January 1973 by Pope Paul VI
- Consecration: 20 September 1986 by Jozef Tomko
- Created cardinal: 24 November 2007 by Pope Benedict XVI
- Rank: Cardinal priest

Personal details
- Born: John Njue; 1 January 1946 (age 80) Embu, Colony and Protectorate of Kenya
- Denomination: Roman Catholic
- Motto: In veritate testimonium, in caritate servitium ('Testimony in truth, service in charity')
- Coat of arms: John Njue's coat of arms

Styles of John Njue
- Reference style: His Eminence
- Spoken style: Your Eminence
- Informal style: Cardinal

Ordination history of John Njue
History
Priestly ordination
- Ordained by: Pope Paul VI
Episcopal consecration
- Principal consecrator: Jozef Tomko
- Co-consecrators: Bishop Silas Silvius Njiru and Bishop Raphael S. Ndingi Mwana a'Nzeki
Cardinalate
- Elevated by: Pope Benedict XVI
Episcopal succession
Bishops consecrated by John Njue as principal consecrator
- James Maria Wainaina Kungu: 27 June 2009
- Paul Kariuki Njiru: 25 July 2009
- Maurice Muhatia Makumba: 27 February 2010
- Dominic Kimengich: 22 May 2010
- Emanuel Barbara: 9 July 2011
- Joseph Ndembu Mbatia: 24 March 2012
- John Oballa Owaa: 14 April 2012
- Joseph Alessandro: 29 September 2012

John Njue (born 1 January 1946) is a Kenyan cardinal of the Catholic Church. He was the fourth Archbishop of Nairobi from 2007 to 2021. He previously served as Coadjutor Archbishop of Nyeri from 2002 to 2007 and Bishop of Embu from 1986 to 2002. He was elevated to the rank of cardinal in 2007.

== Biography ==
Njue was born in Embu, Kenya, on 1 January 1946 (Note: His exact birthdate is apparently unknown. For years Vatican sources said he was born in 1944, but in 2024 began reporting his birth date as 1 January 1946.) to Joseph Nyanga Kibariki and Monica Ngina Nyaga. He was baptized in 1948 and entered the minor seminary in Nkubu in 1962. From 1967 to 1974, he furthered his studies in Rome at the Pontifical Urbaniana University (where he obtained a licentiate in philosophy) and Pontifical Lateran University (licentiate in pastoral theology).

On 6 January 1973, Njue was ordained to the priesthood by Pope Paul VI in St. Peter's Basilica. Returning to Kenya in October 1974, he did pastoral work in Kariakomu in the southern district of Meru. He also taught philosophy at the National Seminary of Bungoma, of which he later served as rector from 1978 to 1982. In 1982, he completed a course in spirituality in the United States. He then served as a parish priest in Chuka and rector of the Philosophical Seminary of Meru.

On 9 June 1986, Njue was appointed Bishop of Embu by Pope John Paul II. He received his episcopal consecration on 20 September from cardinal Jozef Tomko, the co-consecrators being Bishops Silas Silvius Njiru and Raphael Ndingi Mwana'a Nzeki. He served as President of the Kenyan Episcopal Conference from 1997 to 2003 and was named Coadjutor Archbishop of Nyeri on 23 January 2002. Following the murder of Bishop Luigi Locati, he served as Apostolic Administrator of Isolo from 2005 to 2006.

Njue was appointed Archbishop of Nairobi on 6 October 2007 and was installed on the following 1 November. Shortly afterwards, he was created Cardinal-Priest of Preziosissimo Sangue di Nostro Signore Gesù Cristo by Pope Benedict XVI in the consistory of 24 November 2007. On 12 June 2008 he was named a member of the Congregation for the Evangelization of Peoples and the Congregation for the Clergy. On 29 December 2011 he was appointed a member of the Pontifical Council for Social Communications for a five-year renewable term. Cardinal Njue serves as Vice President of the International Catholic Migration Commission.

On 28 March 2013, he appealed for calm and peace during the upcoming Easter season as the Supreme Court of Kenya prepared to announce its verdict in the disputed initial round of the presidential election held on 4 March between Uhuru Kenyatta and Kenya's Prime Minister Raila Odinga. Kenyatta and Deputy President-elect William Ruto were facing charges at the International Criminal Court (ICC) at The Hague that they instigated post-electoral violence in Kenya after the 2007 election.

He was one of the cardinal electors who participated in the 2013 papal conclave that elected Pope Francis.

On 30 November 2013, Njue was named a member of the Congregation for Catholic Education by Pope Francis.

In June 2013, after US President Barack Obama, whose father was a Kenyan, said during an official visit to Senegal that African governments should follow the US example in taking action on gay rights, Njue replied "Let him forget, forget and forget". He said that the United States has "ruined their own societies" and that he does not "think God was making a mistake when he created Adam and Eve". A few weeks later, the Apostolic Nuncio to Kenya, Archbishop Charles Daniel Balvo, alongside Bishop Paul Kariuki Njiru of Embu, told a Catholic assembly that "The homosexuals should be defended against violation of their dignity and human rights, they are human beings like anyone of us."

In March 2014, Njue advised against participation in a free government program to vaccinate women of reproductive age against tetanus. He said that targeting women was "fishy". Other critics suggested the program was a disguised form of birth control. Government health officials said they were accustomed to such rumors from the government's critics. He led the Kenyan bishops in a campaign against the WHO-sponsored vaccination program, asserting that the vaccine was designed to lower fertility.

In June 2017, at a celebration of Family Day, Njue criticized men who put roadblocks in the way of marriages by making exorbitant demands for payment from the groom's family (bride price).

Pope Francis accepted his resignation as Archbishop of Nairobi on 4 January 2021. Despite being eligible to serve as an elector, Njue was one of two eligible cardinal electors (the other being Antonio Cañizares Llovera of Spain) who did not participate in the 2025 papal conclave because of health problems.

== Notes ==
Catholic Church titles
Diocese created	Bishop of Embu; 9 June 1986 – 9 March 2002	Succeeded by Anthony Muheria
Preceded by Raphael S. Ndingi Mwana'a Nzeki	Archbishop of Nairobi; 6 October 2007 – 4 January 2021	Succeeded by Philip Anyolo
Titular church established	Cardinal-Priest of Preziosissimo Sangue di Nostro Signore Gesù Cristo; 24 November 2007 –	Incumbent
