= Catholic Church in Kenya =

- Swahili: Kanisa Katoliki nchini Kenya
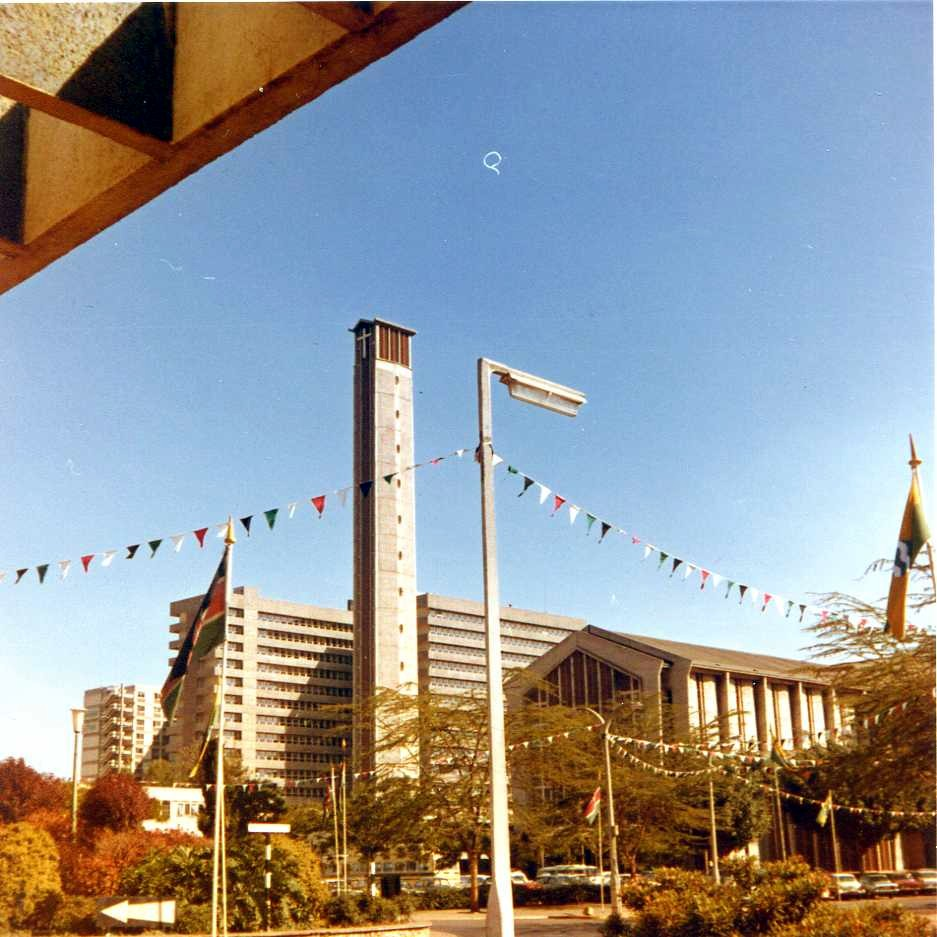
- Nairobi Holy Family Cathedral
- Type: National polity
- Classification: Catholic
- Scripture: Bible
- Theology: Catholic theology
- Governance: KCCB
- Pope: Leo XIV
- Chairperson: Philip Anyolo
- Apostolic Nuncio: Vacant as of 9 April 2026
- Region: Kenya
- Language: Kiswahili, English, Kenyan Sign Language
- Headquarters: Nairobi
- Origin: c. 1498
- Members: 9,700,000–18,000,000
- Official website: Kenya Conference of Catholic Bishops

The Catholic Church in Kenya is part of the worldwide Catholic Church, under the spiritual leadership of the Kenya Conference of Catholic Bishops (KCCB) and the Pope in Vatican City. With between 10 and 18 million adherents, (Note: depending on the measure applied) it ranks among the largest Christian denominations in the country and is a principal actor in education, healthcare, and civic life. Its presence spans four ecclesiastical provinces, twenty-five dioceses, more than 1,100 parishes, and a large network of social institutions that constitute one of the most visible institutional forces in Kenyan life.

== History ==
=== Portuguese missionary contact (1498–1740) ===
The earliest documented encounter between Catholic Christianity and the peoples of what is now Kenya occurred in 1498 when the fleet of the Portuguese navigator Vasco da Gama called at Malindi on the East African coast, accompanied by Roman Catholic missionaries, though none were left permanently in the region at that time. The Franciscan missionary Francis Xavier, travelling to India, held discussions with Muslim leaders at Malindi in 1542. In 1564 the Portuguese Viceroy of India ordered the proclamation of the Gospel along the Mombasa coastline, and three years later an Augustinian monastery was established in the town.

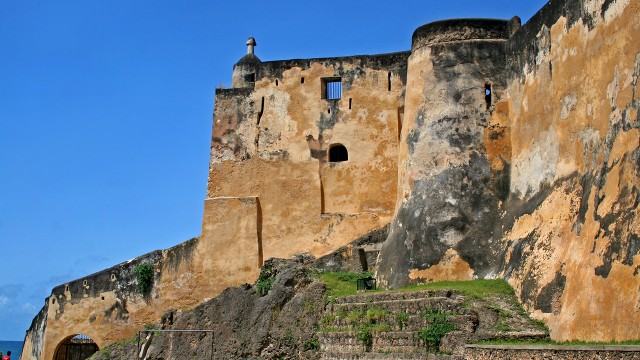
A photo of Fort Jesus in modern-day Mombasa

Construction of Fort Jesus by the Portuguese began in 1592. By 1597 Augustinian friars stationed at Mombasa reported approximately 600 African converts, among them freed slaves, Swahili traders, and Bantu communities from the interior, including the exiled King of Pemba. Three Augustinian priests were subsequently posted to the islands of Lamu, Pate, and Faza, and a Muslim governor at Faza assisted in constructing a chapel. Additional chapels were erected at Shela on Lamu island. The principal ecclesiastical buildings in Mombasa's Ndia Kuu included an Augustinian convent, a parish church, and the church of the Misericordia, all recorded by a French visitor in 1846 though subsequently destroyed.

In 1607 the Brethren of Mercy arrived in Mombasa to minister to converts from Islam. The Christian presence suffered a severe reverse in 1626 when the Swahili Sultan of Mombasa, Yusuf ibn al-Hasan, who had been baptised in Goa as Dom Jeronimo Chingulia, renounced Christianity. Five years later he massacred the Prior of Mombasa, two priests, and approximately 280 lay persons who refused to apostatise; they are commemorated as the Martyrs of Mombasa. In 1636 the mission at Faza was abandoned following an invasion from Muscat. The Arab capture of Fort Jesus and the final extinction of Portuguese influence along the East African coast by 1740 brought the first extended period of Catholic activity to a close.

=== Renewed mission activity (1844–1900) ===
The modern Catholic mission to Kenya is conventionally dated from the arrival of the Congregation of the Holy Spirit (Spiritans, also known as the Holy Ghost Fathers) on the Kenyan coast in the second half of the nineteenth century. On 30 December 1889 Father Gommenginger and Brother Acheul of that congregation founded the first Catholic mission of the modern era at Ndera on the Tana River. Father Alexandre Le Roy, later Bishop and Superior General of the congregation, established the first Catholic mission at Mombasa in September 1891. On 12 August 1899 three members of the same congregation, Bishop Allegayer, Father Hemery, and Brother Blanchard, arrived in Nairobi on the newly completed Uganda Railway and established St. Austin's Parish, inaugurating the Catholic mission to the Kikuyu people of the central highlands.

The arrival of the Imperial British East Africa Company in 1889 and the subsequent establishment of colonial rule created conditions in which missionary activity expanded rapidly. The Mill Hill Missionaries settled among the Pokomo people along the Tana River, and the Africa Inland Mission established itself in Ukambani. In September 1912 Fathers Leconte and Blais established a camp at Kombe/Kabaa, beginning a substantial Catholic presence in Ukambani.

=== Expansion in the twentieth century ===
During the ninety years from 1889 to 1979, the Holy Ghost Fathers concentrated their Kenyan missionary effort on the three dioceses of Mombasa, Nairobi, and Machakos. Regional conflict, difficult terrain, and a largely nomadic way of life in northern Kenya meant that the Church became more firmly established there only during the twentieth century. The post-independence era after 1963 saw accelerating Africanisation of the Church's leadership. Michael Cardinal Otunga, born in western Kenya, became the first Kenyan Cardinal when Pope Paul VI appointed him in 1973, and served as Archbishop of Nairobi until 1997.

In November 1979 a district council meeting of the Holy Ghost Fathers resolved to undertake a new missionary frontier in the East Pokot region of Nakuru Diocese. The first missionaries, Father Gerry Foley and Father Sean McGovern, reached Kositei in August and September 1980 respectively, finding no Catholic presence anywhere in East Pokot. Alongside catechetical work, the missionaries built eight primary schools in the first decade, established preventive and curative medical services in cooperation with the Sisters of the Incarnate Word, and introduced camel breeding and restocking programmes in collaboration with local Pokot communities. Subsequent mission stations were opened at Barpello in the early 1980s and at Tangulbei in 1991.

== Demographics ==
According to official Catholic Church records, there are over 18 million baptised Catholics in Kenya, constituting approximately 40 percent of the national population. The 2019 Kenya Population and Housing Census enumerated 10.6 million Catholics who described themselves as regular Mass attendants, making Catholicism the single largest religious community in the country by that measure. In 2020 more than 3,644 priests were working across over 1,100 parishes throughout the country. According to the September 2025 Afrobarometer survey, 70 percent of Kenyans expressed trust in religious leaders, a higher level than for any government or political institution, and Archbishop Anthony Muheria of Nyeri stated that the Catholic Church is currently the most trusted individual church in Kenya.

== Organisation ==
Within Kenya the Catholic Church is structured into four ecclesiastical provinces, each headed by an archdiocese, with suffragan dioceses subordinate to each.

=== Province of Kisumu ===
The Roman Catholic Archdiocese of Kisumu covers much of the Lake Victoria basin and western Kenya. Its suffragan dioceses are Bungoma, Eldoret, Homa Bay, Kakamega, Kapsabet, Kisii, Kitale, and Lodwar.

=== Province of Mombasa ===
The Roman Catholic Archdiocese of Mombasa serves the coastal region. Its suffragan dioceses are Garissa and Malindi.

=== Province of Nairobi ===
The Roman Catholic Archdiocese of Nairobi is the primatial see and the seat of the KCCB. Its suffragan dioceses are Kericho, Kitui, Machakos, Nakuru, Ngong, and Wote.

=== Province of Nyeri ===
The Roman Catholic Archdiocese of Nyeri covers the Mount Kenya region. Its suffragan dioceses are Embu, Maralal, Marsabit, Meru, Murang'a, and Nyahururu.

== Governance ==
The Kenya Conference of Catholic Bishops (KCCB), headquartered in Nairobi, is the permanent assembly of all Catholic bishops in Kenya and serves as the principal governing body of the Church at the national level. It coordinates pastoral activities, represents the Church before civil authorities, and issues collective pastoral statements. The KCCB maintains a general secretariat and a number of specialist commissions covering education, health, justice and peace, and social communications. The current Chairperson of the KCCB is Archbishop Philip Anyolo of Nairobi. The Apostolic Nunciature to Kenya, which represents the Holy See, is vacant as of April 2026.

== Education ==
The Catholic Church has been involved in formal education in Kenya since the earliest mission stations of the nineteenth century. St. Austin's Mission, founded in Nairobi in 1899, established a school for local children as one of its first activities. Catholic mission schools spread rapidly across the country during the colonial period, providing primary education that governments of the day lacked the capacity to deliver at scale.

At independence in 1963 the Church transferred a number of its schools to the new government while retaining sponsorship of a large number of others. Church-sponsored schools are administered jointly by the Ministry of Education and the sponsoring diocese, which retains rights over the religious character of the institution and the appointment of religious education teachers. At the tertiary level the Church operates the Catholic University of Eastern Africa (CUEA), based in Nairobi, founded by the Association of Member Episcopal Conferences in Eastern Africa (AMECEA) and chartered by the Kenyan government.

== Healthcare ==
Through the Catholic Health Commission of the KCCB, the Catholic Church operates approximately 497 mission hospitals, health centres, and dispensaries across Kenya, representing roughly 30 percent of all health facilities in the country. This network provides services in many parts of rural Kenya where government facilities are absent or scarce, and includes specialist provision in HIV/AIDS treatment, maternal and child health, and palliative care.

In July 2020, Kenya's Cabinet Secretary for Health, Mutahi Kagwe, presiding over the opening of a new outpatient wing at Kiriaini Mission Hospital in Murang'a Diocese, acknowledged the contribution of the Catholic health network, noting that thousands of patients had been served through the care and support offered by the Catholic family, and described the expansion as timely given the concurrent COVID-19 pandemic. Kiriaini Mission Hospital was established in 1955 as a dispensary by the Consolata Sisters and had grown to a government-approved bed capacity of 72 by 2020, coming under the administration of the Assisi Sisters of Mary Immaculate of India. Several dioceses, including Lodwar in the arid north, maintain standalone health networks aimed at underserved nomadic and pastoralist communities.

== Social services and humanitarian work ==
Caritas Kenya, the official development and humanitarian agency of the KCCB, coordinates the Church's response to poverty, disaster, and structural inequality through diocesan Caritas offices and in partnership with Catholic Relief Services and Caritas Internationalis. Areas of activity include food security, water and sanitation, refugee assistance, and climate resilience; in periods of drought Caritas Kenya has collaborated with international partners to reach large numbers of affected persons in arid and semi-arid counties.

Catholic social teaching highlights the Church's advocacy on economic justice, labour rights, and environmental stewardship. Several dioceses have partnered with financial institutions on reforestation and climate change adaptation at the community level. The KCCB Justice and Peace Commission regularly publishes reports and statements on land rights, corruption, and the rights of marginalised groups.

== Political and civic role ==
The Catholic Church in Kenya has a long history of engagement in public affairs and has, at various times, exercised considerable influence on national political debate. During the single-party era of the 1980s and early 1990s, Catholic bishops were among the most prominent voices calling for political liberalisation and multi-party democracy. Archbishop Raphael S. Ndingi Mwana a'Nzeki of Nairobi was particularly noted for outspoken criticism of the Moi government's human rights record.

After a period of reduced public commentary in the 2000s and 2010s, described in Kenyan media as a two-decade hiatus from the bishops' earlier prominence, the KCCB reasserted a critical public voice during the presidency of William Ruto, which began in 2022. In 2024, as protests led primarily by young Kenyans erupted over taxation and governance concerns, the bishops collectively condemned police violence against demonstrators while urging structured dialogue in place of street action. Archbishop Anthony Muheria of Nyeri became a particularly prominent voice in this period, described by commentators as reviving the prophetic tradition associated with his predecessors. Speaking under the KCCB umbrella and as individuals, the bishops have continued to engage on a range of social and political matters, including corruption, abductions, and economic governance.

== Church-state relations ==
Relations between the Catholic Church and Kenyan governments have alternated between cooperation and tension. The KCCB and the state have cooperated extensively in the delivery of education and health services, with the Church acting as a key provider in underserved areas. At the same time, the bishops have periodically accused successive governments of attempting to subordinate Church institutions to state control, particularly with respect to the staffing and curriculum of church-sponsored schools and the funding arrangements for mission hospitals.

In April 2024 the KCCB accused the government of pursuing a systematic scheme to subvert the Church by interfering in the management of Catholic schools and hospitals and diverting National Hospital Insurance Fund disbursements away from mission health facilities. The bishops also objected to the government's decision to invite political figures to deliver speeches on church premises, with the Catholic Church formally declining to permit such appearances on its properties.
