= Archdiocese of Nairobi =

Roman Catholic archdiocese in Kenya

Coordinates: 1.2871°S 36.8205°E

Archdiocese of Nairobi Archidioecesis Nairobiensis
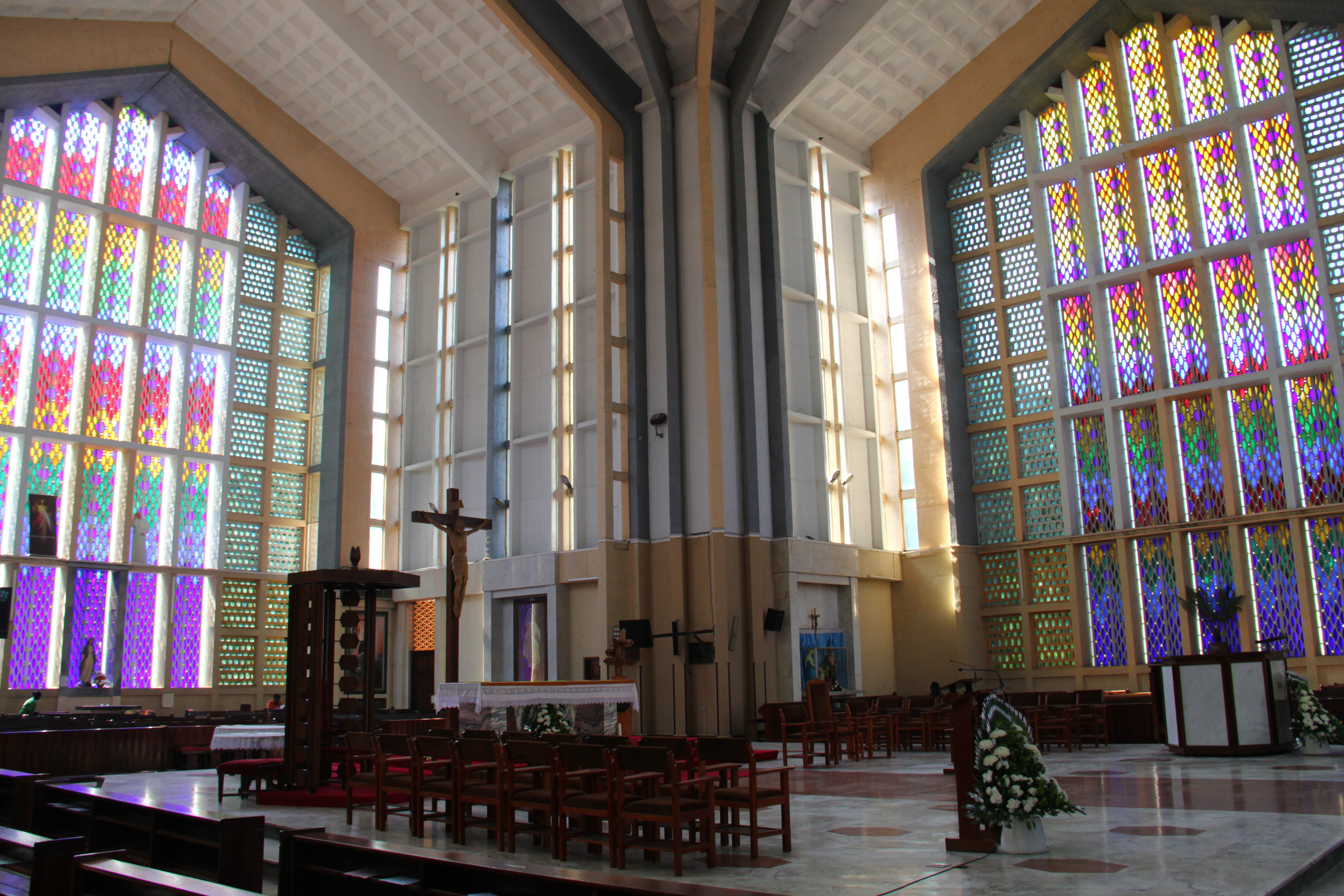
- Interior of the Holy Family Cathedral

Location
- Country: Kenya
- Ecclesiastical province: Nairobi

Statistics
- Area: 3,271 km^{2} (1,263 sq mi)
- Population: Total; Catholics: (as of 2013); 4,687,481; 2,911,099 (62.1%)
- Parishes: 115

Information
- Sui iuris church: Latin Church
- Rite: Roman Rite
- Established: 1860
- Cathedral: Holy Family cathedral

Current leadership
- Pope: Leo XIV
- Metropolitan Archbishop: Philip Anyolo
- Auxiliary Bishops: David Kamau; Obed Muriungi Karobia
- Bishops emeritus: John Njue

Website
- archdioceseofnairobi.org

The Roman Catholic Archdiocese of Nairobi (Latin: Nairobien(sis)) is the Metropolitan See for the ecclesiastical province of Nairobi in Kenya, and the Primatial see for Kenya.

== History ==
- 26 February 1860: Established as Apostolic Prefecture of Zanguebar from the Diocese of Saint-Denis-de-La Réunion in Réunion
- 23 November 1883: Promoted as Apostolic Vicariate of Zanguebar
- 1887: Renamed as Apostolic Vicariate of Northern Zanguebar
- 21 December 1906: Renamed as Apostolic Vicariate of Zanzibar
- 25 March 1953: Promoted as Metropolitan Archdiocese of Nairobi

== Special churches ==
The seat of the archbishop is a minor basilica, the Cathedral of the Holy Family in Nairobi.

== Bishops ==
- Vicar Apostolic of Northern Zanguebar (Latin Church)
  - Bishop Jean-Marie-Raoul Le Bas de Courmont (27 October 1883 – 27 November 1896)
- Vicars Apostolic of Zanzibar (Latin Church)
  - Bishop Emile-Auguste Allgeyer (17 February 1897 – 3 April 1913)
  - Bishop John Gerald Neville (1 September 1913 – 8 March 1930)
  - Bishop John William Heffernan (15 March 1932 - 7 June 1945)
  - Bishop John Joseph McCarthy (11 July 1946 – 25 March 1953); see below
- Metropolitan Archbishops of Nairobi (Latin Church)
  - Archbishop John Joseph McCarthy (25 March 1953 – 24 October 1971); see above
  - Archbishop Maurice Michael Otunga (24 October 1971 – 14 May 1997) (Cardinal in 1973)
  - Archbishop Raphael Ndingi Mwana'a Nzeki (21 April 1997 – 6 October 2007)
  - Archbishop John Njue (6 October 2007 – 4 January 2021) (Cardinal in 2007)
  - Archbishop Philip Anyolo (28 October 2021 – present)

=== Coadjutor Archbishops ===
- Raphael Simon Ndingi Mwana’a Nzeki (1996-1997)
- Maurice Michael Otunga (1969-1971); future Cardinal

=== Auxiliary Bishops ===
- Anthony Ireri Mukobo (1999-2006). Appointed Vicar Apostolic of Isiolo
- David Kamau Ng'ang'a (Since 22 December 1999)
- Alfred Kipkoech Arap Rotich (1996-1997). Appointed Bishop of Kenya, Military
- Simon Peter Kamomoe (13 February 2024 - 5 July 2025) Appointed Auxiliary Bishop of Wote
- Wallace Ng'ang'a Gachihi (13 February 2024 - 12 October 2024). Appointed Bishop of Kenya, Military (Since 12 October 2024)
- Obed Muriungi Karobia :Auxiliary Bishop). (Since 26 March 2026)

== Suffragan dioceses ==
- Kericho
- Kitui
- Machakos
- Nakuru
- Ngong
- Wote

== Sources ==
- GCatholic.org
