= Roman Catholic Diocese of Machakos =

Roman Catholic diocese in Kenya

Coordinates: 1.5189°S 37.2672°E

Diocese of Machakos Dioecesis Machakosensis

Location
- Country: Kenya
- Metropolitan: Nairobi

Statistics
- Area: 15,183 km^{2} (5,862 sq mi)

Information
- Rite: Roman Rite
- Cathedral: Cathedral of Our Lady of Lourdes

Current leadership
- Pope: Leo XIV
- Bishop: Norman King'oo Wambua

The Catholic Diocese of Machakos (Latin: Machakosen(sis)) is a diocese located in the Town of Machakos in the ecclesiastical province of Nairobi in Kenya.

== History ==
- May 29, 1969: Established as Diocese of Machakos from Metropolitan Archdiocese of Nairobi

== Leadership ==
- Bishops of Machakos (Latin Church)
  - Raphael S. Ndingi Mwana a'Nzeki (29 May 1969 – 30 Aug 1971), appointed Bishop of Nakuru; future Archbishop
  - Urbanus Joseph Kioko (9 Jul 1973 – 15 Mar 2003)
  - Boniface Lele (Apostolic Administrator 24 Jan 2003 – 15 Mar 2003); future Archbishop
  - Martin Kivuva Musonde (15 Mar 2003 - Feb 2015), appointed Archbishop of Mombasa on 9 Dec 2014
  - Anthony Muheria (Apostolic Administrator Feb 2015 - 25 Aug 2018), appointed Archbishop of Nyeri on 23 Apr 2017
  - Norman King'oo Wambua (since 23 June 2018)
  - Joseph Mwongela, Coadjutor Bishop (since 4 January 2026)

== See also ==
- Roman Catholicism in Kenya

== Sources ==
- GCatholic.org
- Catholic Hierarchy
