= Philip Anyolo =

Kenyan prelate of the Catholic Church

His Excellency, The Most Reverend Philip Anyolo
- Archbishop of Nairobi
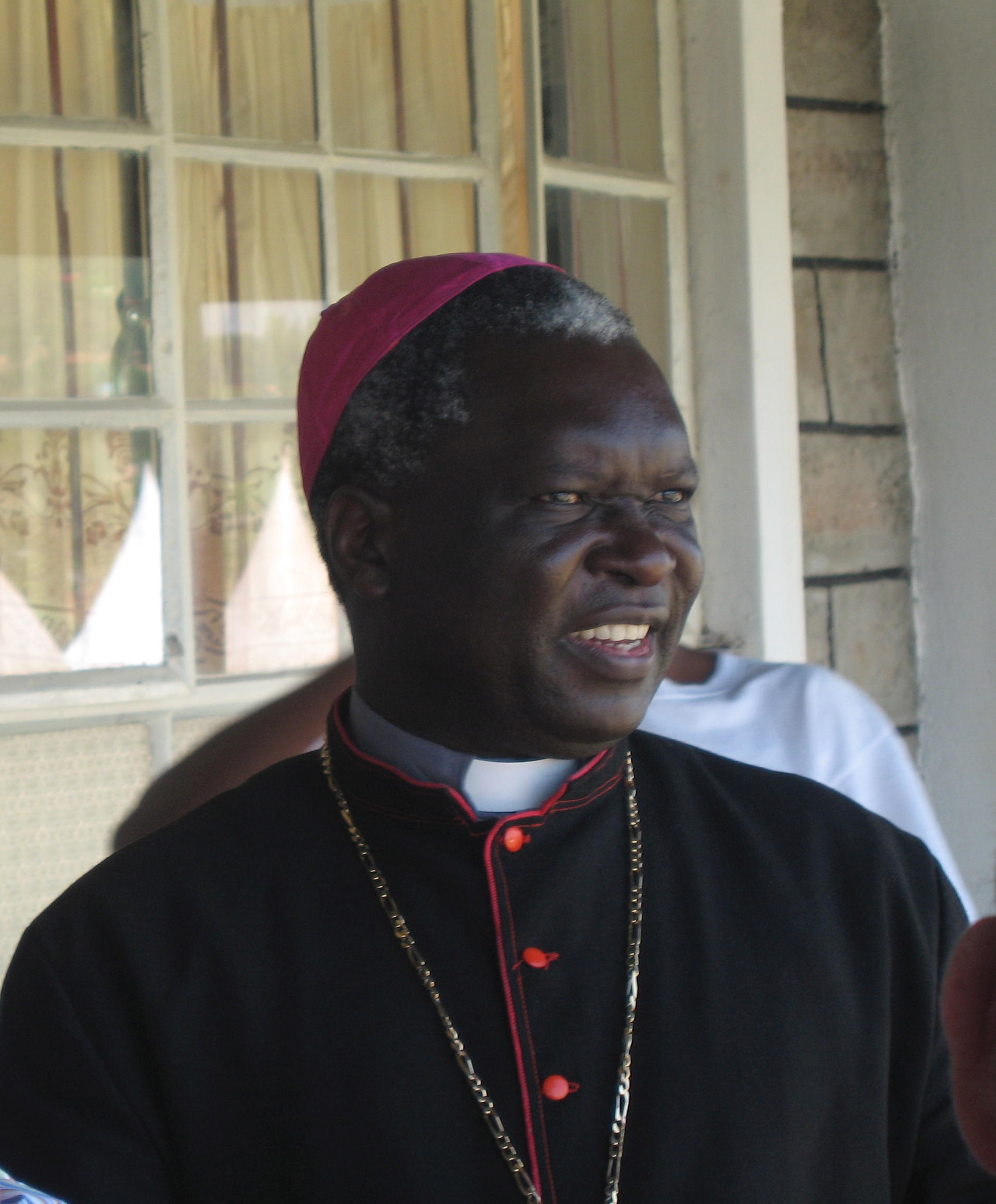
- Church: Catholic Church
- Archdiocese: Roman Catholic Archdiocese of Nairobi
- Metropolis: Nairobi
- See: Roman Catholic Archdiocese of Nairobi
- Appointed: 28 October 2021
- Predecessor: John Njue
- Other post: President of the Kenyan Episcopal Conference (2015–)
- Previous posts: Bishop of Kericho (1995–2003); Bishop of Homa Bay (2003–18); Archbishop of Kisumu (2018–21)

Orders
- Ordination: 15 October 1983 by John Njenga
- Consecration: 3 February 1996 by Jozef Tomko

Personal details
- Born: Philip Arnold Subira Anyolo; 18 May 1956 (age 70) Tongaren, Bungoma, Kenya
- Motto: MANETE IN ME, ET EGO IN VOBIS ('ABIDE IN ME, AND I IN YOU')
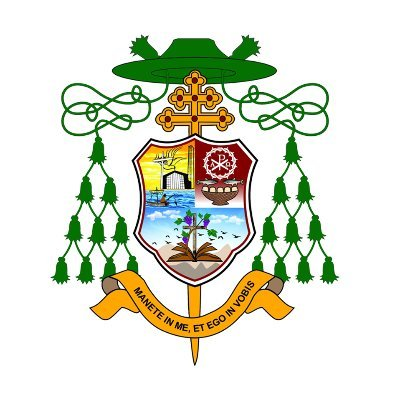
- Coat of arms

Styles of Philip Arnold Subira Anyolo
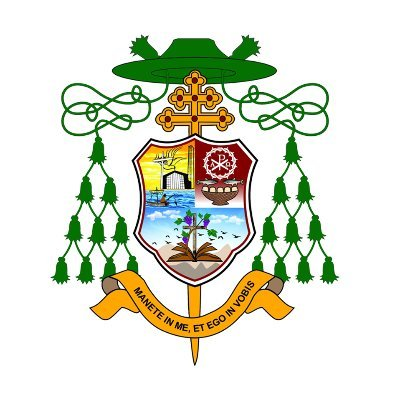
- Reference style: His Grace, The Most Reverend
- Spoken style: Your Grace
- Religious style: Archbishop

Ordination history of Philip Anyolo
History
Priestly ordination
- Ordained by: John Njenga
Episcopal consecration
- Principal consecrator: Jozef Tomko
- Co-consecrators: Maurice Michael Otunga and Cornelius Korir

Philip Arnold Subira Anyolo (born 18 May 1956) is a Kenyan prelate of the Catholic Church who has been the Archbishop of Nairobi since 2021. He has been a bishop since 1996, serving as ordinary in Kericho from 1996 to 2003, Homa Bay from 2003 to 2018, and Archbishop of the Metropolitan Archdiocese of Kisumu from 2019 to 2021.

== Biography ==
Philip Arnold Subira Anyolo was born on 18 May 1956 in Tongaren, Bungoma, the second of ten children born to Mzee Paul Anyolo and Mama Dina Nekesa. He attended Kakamwe primary school in Tongaren and Mother of Apostles Minor Seminary in Eldoret, St. Augustine Major Seminary in Mabanga for philosophy, and St. Thomas Aquinas in Nairobi for theology. He was ordained a deacon in 1982 and he was ordained a priest for the Catholic Diocese of Eldoret, Kenya, on 15 October 1983 by John Njenga, Bishop of Eldoret.

He served as the bishop's secretary for two and a half years while assisting with parish work. Beginning in 1987 he studied in Austria, earning a doctorate in systematic theology from the University of Innsbruck in 1993. Returning then to his role as bishop's secretary, he also worked as chaplain of Moi University and was a visiting lecturer at St. Matthias Mulumba Major Seminary.

Pope John Paul II appointed him the first bishop of the newly erected Roman Catholic Diocese of Kericho on 6 December 1995. He received his episcopal consecration in Kericho on 3 February 1996 from Cardinal Jozef Tomko, prefect of the Congregation for the Evangelization of Peoples. He chose as his episcopal motto "Abide in Me and I in you" (John 15:4).

On 20 February 2002, he was appointed Apostolic Administrator of the Roman Catholic Diocese of Homa Bay, upon the resignation of Bishop Linus Okok Okwach. On 22 March 2003, Pope John Paul appointed him bishop of that diocese. He was installed on 23 May 2003.

He has served as the Chairperson of the Kenya Conference of Catholic Bishops.

Pope Francis named him archbishop of Kisumu on 15 November 2018 and he was installed there on 12 January 2019.

On 28 October 2021, Pope Francis appointed him archbishop of the Roman Catholic Archdiocese of Nairobi. He was installed there on 20 November 2021.
