= Maurice Michael Otunga =

Catholic cardinal (1923-2003)

Servant of God Maurice Michael Otunga
- Archbishop Emeritus of Nairobi
- Church: Roman Catholic Church
- Archdiocese: Nairobi
- Metropolis: Nairobi
- See: Nairobi
- Appointed: 24 October 1971
- Term ended: 14 May 1997
- Predecessor: John Joseph McCarthy
- Successor: Raphael S. Ndingi Mwana a'Nzeki
- Other post: Cardinal-Priest of San Gregorio Barbarigo alle Tre Fontane (1973-2003)
- Previous posts: Titular Bishop of Tacape (1956-60); Auxiliary Bishop of Kisumu (1956-60); Bishop of Kisii (1960-69); Military Vicar of Kenya (1964-86); Titular Archbishop of Bomarza (1969-71); Coadjutor of Nairobi (1969-71); President of the Kenyan Episcopal Conference (1970-76); Military Ordinary of Kenya (1981-97)

Orders
- Ordination: 3 October 1950 by Pietro Fumasoni Biondi
- Consecration: 25 February 1957 by James Robert Knox
- Created cardinal: 5 March 1973 by Pope Paul VI
- Rank: Cardinal-Priest

Personal details
- Born: Maurice Michael Otunga; January 1923 Chebukwa, Bungoma, Colony and Protectorate of Kenya
- Died: 6 September 2003 (aged 80) Mater Misericordiae Hospital, Nairobi, Kenya
- Education: Pontifical Urban University
- Motto: Per ipsum et cum ipso et in ipso ("Through Him, with Him, and in Him")

Styles of Maurice Michael Otunga
- Reference style: His Eminence
- Spoken style: Your Eminence
- Posthumous style: Servant of God
- Informal style: Cardinal
- See: Nairobi (Emeritus)

Ordination history of Maurice Michael Otunga
History
Priestly ordination
- Ordained by: Pietro Fumasoni Biondi
- Date: 3 October 1950
- Place: Rome, Italy
Episcopal consecration
- Principal consecrator: James Robert Knox
- Co-consecrators: Frederick Hall + John Joseph McCarthy
- Date: 25 February 1957
- Place: Kakamega, Kenya
Cardinalate
- Elevated by: Pope Paul VI
- Date: 5 March 1973
Episcopal succession
Bishops consecrated by Maurice Michael Otunga as principal consecrator
- Urbanus Joseph Kioko: 7 October 1973
- Silas Silvius Njiru: 1 January 1976
- Colin Cameron Davies, M.H.M.: 27 February 1977
- John Christopher Mahon, S.P.S.: 25 April 1978
- Zacchaeus Okoth: 30 April 1978
- Nicodemus Kirima: 14 May 1978
- Ambrogio Ravasi, I.M.C.: 18 October 1981
- Erkolano Lodu Tombe: 28 November 1986
- Joseph Mairura Okemwa: 21 July 1995
- Alfred Kipkoech Arap Rotich: 3 July 1996

Maurice Michael Otunga (January 1923 – 6 September 2003) was a Kenyan Catholic prelate and cardinal. He served as the Archbishop of Nairobi from 1971 until his resignation in 1997. Pope Paul VI elevated him into the cardinalate in 1973 as the Cardinal-Priest of San Gregorio Barbarigo alle Tre Fontane in Rome.

The son of a tribal chief in Kenya, Otunga refused to succeed his father in the traditional position in order to pursue a path to the Catholic priesthood after completing his studies at home and in Rome. He was appointed a bishop in the 1950s and transferred to lead a new diocese.

He later was transferred to Nairobi, from where he participated in the Second Vatican Council.

Otunga was known for his strong opposition to the use of condoms, most concerned about their being used for contraception. Despite the spread of AIDS and the recommended use of condoms to prevent sexually transmitted diseases, twice in the 1990s Otunga burnt boxes of condoms before the faithful. He said that contraception was in breach of Christian teaching and that it opposed the doctrine of Humanae Vitae issued in 1968, both of which are accurate teachings of the Catholic Church. He was also a vocal critic of abortion, again following Church teachings which remain unchanged to this day, and was critical of priests who became involved in social and political controversies.

Based on his strong service to the Church, his cause of canonization has commenced. He has been titled as a Servant of God.

== Life ==
=== Childhood and conversion ===
Maurice Michael Otunga was born in 1923 to Wasike Lusweti Sudi (a chieftain of the Bukusu) tribe) and Rosa Namisi. His father followed traditional African religion.

His father had about 70 wives and children with woman. He taught Otunga the basic tenets of their traditional religion. The boy was named Otunga, meaning a staff that elderly lean on for support. His original name was "Odunga" but it was changed to "Otunga" since the Lubukusu language has no "D" sound. But this was his second name: his father had called him this because he felt it was better than the name his mother had chosen for him. Rosa named her infant son "Simiyu" upon his birth. She had two other boys, his full brothers John Kalibo and Christopher Nakitare.

Otunga converted to Catholicism and was baptized in 1935 (by Fr. Leo Pulaert); he was given the names "Maurice Michael". His father was later baptized in 1963 and his mother also later in 1965. Otunga received his Confirmation on 29 September 1939 from Bishop Joseph Shanahan.

=== Education and priesthood ===
Otunga studied at Mill High School in Kibabii from 1931 to 1933, and later at another school in Sijei from 1933 to 1934. He finished his studies at Mang'u High School in Kabaa from 1934 to 1935. He obtained a licentiate in his theological studies in September 1951.

Otunga began ecclesial studies in Kakamega. He completed his philosophical and theological studies at the Gaba ecclesial school in Kampala, Uganda. He refused to become his tribe's chieftain after his father resigned from the position in 1947.

Otunga transferred to Rome, where he was a student at the Pontifical Urban from 1947 until 1950. There he was ordained to the priesthood on 3 October 1950. He also obtained his theological doctorate in Rome after completing further studies in 1951. That year he travelled in Europe for several months, visiting northern Italian cities, Paris and Lourdes in France, and then to England and Ireland.

Upon his return to Kenya, Otunga was assigned to serve (1951-1954) as a professor in the theological department at the ecclesial school in Kisumu. He also served as the vice-chancellor of the diocesan curia. He was the private aide to James Robert Knox from 1954 until his appointment to the episcopate in 1956. In 1956 Otunga was assigned to serve as a pastor at the Makupa parish in Nairobi.

=== Episcopate ===
Pope Pius XII nominated him to the episcopate; he was made the Titular Bishop of Tacape and received his episcopal consecration from Knox a couple of months later in Kakamega.

Pope John XXIII later transferred Otunga to the new Diocese of Kisii. Otunga attended the four sessions of the Second Vatican Council (1962-1965). In 1969 he was promoted to the Titular Archbishop of Bomarza.

Later that year, on 15 November 1969, Pope Paul VI nominated him as the Coadjutor Bishop of Nairobi. He would succeed the current archbishop as its head upon his resignation. He succeeded as the Archbishop of Nairobi on 24 October 1971.

He was president of the Bishop's Conference of Kenya. Otunga served as the vice-president of the Association of Member Episcopal Conferences in Eastern Africa (AMECEA), and a member of the permanent committee of the Episcopal Conferences of Africa and Madagascar (SECAM). He also participated in various episcopal assemblies that the pope convoked in Rome.

=== Cardinalate ===
On 5 March 1973 he was created and proclaimed a cardinal as the Cardinal-Priest of San Gregorio Barbarigo alle Tre Fontane in Rome. He attended the two episcopal assembles which the pope called in Rome in 1974 and 1977. Otunga also participated in the papal conclave of August 1978 and the conclave of October 1978; these elected Pope John Paul I and Pope John Paul II, respectively. Otunga also participated in other episcopal assembles in Rome both in 1980 and 1994.

Otunga was strongly aware of issues related to migrants and refugees. In 1994 in Rome, speaking about Kenya, he said to the world's bishops:

"Peoples on the move cannot be ignored. The displaced persons in Kenya are those citizens rendered homeless on account of tribal violence. Urbanization is another major cause. The victims of discrimination, I think, are particularly those citizens who have to move from place to place in search of employment and this may be due to nepotism, religious discrimination or corruption in the administration of the country. For these people it is difficult to establish stable contacts. For those who already believe, many are in great danger of losing their faith. It becomes more difficult when the situation is politically originated and perpetuated as is the case in Kenya now. Here the bishops have exercised their prophetic role and have spoken out to the government. It is not easy".

Otunga lived in modest conditions and eschewed much of the trappings that came with the episcopal office; he even drove in his own Peugeot 304. He often visited President Daniel Arap Moi to urge him to implement democratic reforms and disapproved of priests becoming involved in social or political controversies. He sought to promote and encourage diocesan vocations and he invited religious congregations to settle and work in Nairobi.

As is customary for cardinals, he served in various departments in the Roman Curia. Those appointments were:

- Congregation for Divine Worship and the Discipline of the Sacraments
- Congregation for Religious and Secular Institutes

=== Resignation and death ===
In 1991 Otunga fell ill but was not allowed to resign by Pope John Paul II. The pope instead appointed a coadjutor bishop who would have the right of succession in case Otunga either died or became unfit to fill the role. In 1992 Otunga suffered a stroke and sent a second resignation letter; this was accepted in 1997. After Otunga retired, he moved into an aged care home. After he turned 80, he was no longer able to vote in papal conclaves.

Otunga died on 6 September 2003 at 6:45am of cardiac arrest in the intensive care unit of the Mater Misericordiae Hospital in Nairobi. He had been hospitalized there for about two months.

His funeral was celebrated on 19 September in Nairobi. His remains were interred in Nairobi at Saint Austin's in Msongari, which was a traditional burial ground for priests or deacons. Otunga was the highest in rank to be interred there. His remains were later transferred to the Karen's Resurrection Gardens on 24 August 2005. His remains were relocated secretly because members of his Bukusu tribe believed that reinterment would result in a curse of their people.

== Legacy and honors ==
In late 2016 the government named a street in Nairobi in his honour: "Cardinal Otunga Road".

== Beatification process ==
In 2005 plans were announced to consider and launch the cause for the late cardinal's beatification. National bishops made their "ad limina apostolorum" visit to Rome in November 2007 and sought advice on the matter from the Congregation for the Causes of Saints.

The formal petition to the cause was made to Cardinal John Njue on 30 October 2009. Njue wrote on 6 November to the Congregation for the Causes of Saints requesting their approval to initiate the cause. The latter voiced their assent, declaring nihil obstat (no objections) on 1 March 2010 and titled Otunga as a Servant of God. Njue announced the cause would open on 6 August 2010 but did not set the date for its opening at that point.

The diocesan process opened in Nairobi on 11 November 2011. A team spoke to 171 witnesses in total and compiled 23,995 pages of documentation regarding the cardinal's life and works. This diocesan investigation closed on 28 September 2013. The documents were sealed in boxes and given to the papal nuncio Charles Daniel Balvo for transfer to the C.C.S. in Rome. The C.C.S. validated this process on 9 May 2014.

The first postulator for this cause died on 12 August 2012. Since 1 September 2012, the current postulator has been Dr. Waldery Hilgeman.

== Views ==
=== Condoms ===
Otunga opposed the use of condoms for any purpose because of their use for contraception. He urged people to exercise abstinence for birth control. He said that condoms did not solve the HIV/AIDS crisis. He met with local Islamic leaders to jointly conduct ceremonial public bonfires to burn condoms. One such public bonfire was on 19 August 1995 in which he joined the Imam of Nairobi's Jamia Mosque Sheikh Ali Shee in burning condoms and sex education literature.

On 31 August 1996 (before 250 faithful), Otunga burned condoms in Uhuru Park as part of his campaign against their use. He publicly taught that they were against the teachings of the Catholic Church and an affront to Humanae Vitae, which Pope Paul VI had issued in 1968.

=== Family planning ===
Otunga strongly criticized family planning activists. For instance, he said:

"The gospel of family planning and birth control has come into Africa in a big way so that couples who can afford to take care of ten children now prefer adding the latest Mercedes Benz model to their stock of cars to having an additional child!"

=== Abortion ===
Otunga was a strong critic of abortion. He said that human life was sacred from the moment of conception until natural death.

=== Education ===
Otunga supported President Moi's reforms to end sexual education curriculum in schools.

=== Islam ===
Amin al-Hinawi (on 14 January 1993) issued a sharp criticism of Otunga's remarks related to expansion of Islam in Africa. The church clarified that the cardinal was misinterpreted, and that he had been speaking out against "Islamic fundamentalism", which he perceived to be on the rise, rather than the Islamic religion per se.

But Otunga was known to have asserted that claiming Muhammad as the last prophet was a lie since Jesus Christ was the last prophet. These remarks caused considerable debate and outrage among Muslims.

Assistant minister Sharif Nassir asked Otunga on 7 January 1987 to read and understand the Quran, in order to better work for inter-religious dialogue.
