= List of Catholic dioceses in Kenya =

The Roman Catholic Church in Kenya is composed of 4 Metropolitans and 22 suffragan dioceses.

== List of dioceses ==
=== Episcopal Conference of Kenya ===
==== Metropolitan of Kisumu ====
- Archdiocese of Kisumu
  - Diocese of Bungoma
  - Diocese of Eldoret
  - Diocese of Homa Bay
  - Diocese of Kakamega
  - Diocese of Kapsabet
  - Diocese of Kisii
  - Diocese of Kitale
  - Diocese of Lodwar

==== Metropolitan of Mombasa ====
- Archdiocese of Mombasa
  - Diocese of Garissa
  - Diocese of Malindi

==== Metropolitan of Nairobi ====
- Archdiocese of Nairobi
  - Diocese of Kericho
  - Diocese of Kitui
  - Diocese of Machakos
  - Diocese of Nakuru
  - Diocese of Ngong
  - Diocese of Wote

==== Metropolitan of Nyeri ====
- Archdiocese of Nyeri
  - Diocese of Embu
  - Diocese of Isiolo
  - Diocese of Maralal
  - Diocese of Marsabit
  - Diocese of Meru
  - Diocese of Muranga
  - Diocese of Nyahururu
