= Hieronymus Emusugut Joya =

Kenyan Catholic prelate

The Most Reverend Hieronymus Emusugut Joya
- Bishop of Maralal
- Church: Catholic Church
- Archdiocese: Roman Catholic Archdiocese of Nyeri
- See: Mararal
- Appointed: 20 July 2022
- Installed: 22 October 2022
- Predecessor: Virgilio Pante

Orders
- Ordination: 5 September 1998
- Consecration: 22 October 2022 by Hubertus Matheus Maria van Megen
- Rank: Bishop

Personal details
- Born: Hieronymus Emusugut Joya; 17 April 1965 (age 61) Asinge, Kenya

Styles of Hieronymus Emusugut Joya
- Reference style: Your Grace; The Most Reverend
- Spoken style: His Grace
- Religious style: Bishop

Hieronymus Emusugut Joya I.M.C. (born 17 April 1965) is a Kenyan Catholic prelate who has served as the Bishop of the Roman Catholic Diocese of Maralal since 2022. Appointed bishop on 20 July 2022 by Pope Francis, he succeeded retired Bishop Emeritus Virgilio Pante.

== Background and education ==
Joya was born on 17 April 1965 in Asinge Village, Amukura District in Teso South Sub-County in Busia County, Kenya. He was baptized and confirmed at St. Anthony of Padua Chakol Catholic Parish under the Roman Catholic Diocese of Bungoma. He had his primary education at Changana Primary School and Asinge Primary School in Kericho County and Busia County respectively. He entered St. Peter's Minor Seminary Mukumu, under the Roman Catholic Diocese of Kakamega, from 1982 to 1985.

Joya joined the Consolata Missionaries in 1990. He studied Philosophy and graduated with a Diploma in Religious Studies, and BA from the Pontifical Urbaniana University in 1993. He then studied at the Consolata Missionaries Novitiate Sagana, under the Roman Catholic Diocese of Murang'a, from August 1993 to August 1994, the same date he began studying theology at Tangaza University. He graduated with a Diploma in Theology and a Diploma in Mission Studies in 1998. Later, he obtained a BA in Sacred Theology from the Pontifical Urbaniana University and BA in Religious Studies from the Catholic University of Eastern Africa (CUEA).

In the summer of 2003, from June to August, he undertook a Summer Course on Leadership and Psycho-Spiritual growth and development at St Anselm's College in England, UK. He studied at the Catholic University of Eastern Africa from August 2005 and got a Licentiate in Sacred Theology with specialization in Pastoral Theology in May 2007. At the time he was appointed bishop, Joya was pursuing a Doctorate degree in Sacred Theology with specialization in Pastoral Theology at the Catholic University of Eastern Africa (CUEA), in Nairobi, Kenya.

== Priest ==
While still a seminarian, he took his first vows as a member of the Consolata Missionaries on 6 August 1994 and tool his perpetual vows on 8 November 1997. He was ordained a deacon on 9 November 1997. He was ordained a priest of the Consolata Missionaries on 5 September 1998. He served in that capacity until 20 July 2022.

As a priest, he worked at Loiyangalani Catholic Mission in the Roman Catholic Diocese of Marsabit. He also served as Rector and formator at the Consolata Philosophicum Seminary in Nairobi. He was also the Diocesan Pastoral Coordinator and Director of Allamano Pastoral Centre in the Catholic Diocese of Maralal. Previously, between 2011 and 2016 he was the Regional Superior of the Consolata Missionaries in Kenya and Uganda. He served as a lecturer at the Consolata Institute of Philosophy, in Nairobi, while pursuing his doctorate degree.

== As bishop ==
On 20 July 2022, Pope Francis appointed him Bishop of the Roman Catholic Diocese of Maralal. He was consecrated and installed at Maralal in the diocese of Maralal on 22 October 2022. The Principal Consecrator was Archbishop Hubertus Matheus Maria van Megen, Titular Archbishop of Novaliciana assisted by Bishop Peter Kihara Kariuki, I.M.C., Bishop of Marsabit and Bishop Virgilio Pante, I.M.C., Bishop Emeritus of Maralal. He succeeded Bishop Virgilio Pante, the Bishop Emeritus of Maralal, Kenya who retired.

== See also ==
- Catholic Church in Kenya

== Succession table ==
Catholic Church titles
Preceded by Vigilio Pante (15 June 2001 - 20 July 2022)	Bishop of Maralal (since 20 July 2022)	Succeeded by Incumbent
