= Fiorina Cecchin =

Italian religious sister 1877–1925

Blessed Fiorina Cecchin SSGC

Virgin
- Born: 3 April 1877; Cittadella, Padua, Veneto, Kingdom of Italy
- Died: 13 November 1925 (aged 48) in the Red Sea between Egypt and Saudi Arabia
- Venerated in: Roman Catholic Church
- Beatified: 5 November 2022, Kinoru Stadium, Meru, Kenya by Cardinal Antoine Kambanda
- Feast: 13 November

Fiorina Cecchin, SSGC, (religious name Maria Carola; 3 April 1877 – 13 November 1925) was an member of the Sisters of Saint Giuseppe Benedetto Cottolengo.

Ill health prevented her initial entrance into the religious life at 18 before she was accepted into the Cottolengo Sisters in Treviso. Upon her religious vows, she worked as a cook for her colleagues before joining the missions in Africa, where she arrived in 1905. Cecchin became a popular figure in the missions due to her care and attentiveness towards the poor and the sick. She was noted for her zealous activism and the manner in which she educated children in catechism.

Cecchin died in 1925, and the beatification process commenced in Turin in 2014. She was beatified on 5 November 2022 in Meru.

== Biography ==
Fiorina Cecchin was born on 3 April 1877 in Cittadella in the Province of Padua as the fifth of eight children born to Francesco Cecchin and Antonia Geremia. Her eldest two siblings both died as infants.

Cecchin attempted to join the Suore di Santa Dorotea in Vicenza but was rejected on the basis of her fragile health. However, her parish priest and spiritual director provided her with assistance and secured her a place in the Sisters of Saint Giuseppe Benedetto Cottolengo at their house in Bigolino in Treviso when she was nineteen. On 27 August 1896, Cecchin began her postulancy at the Little House of Divine Providence in Turin (she was the 139th postulant that year) and then commenced her novitiate on 2 October 1897, taking the habit on 3 October and the religious name Maria Carola. She made her perpetual vows on 6 January 1899. Following her profession, she was appointed as a cook first at the boarding school that the congregation managed at Giaveno and then at the motherhouse in Turin, however, she longed to join the missions in Africa as it was a longstanding ambition that she held, indeed, submitting a formal request to her superiors to enter the missions on 19 March 1904.

In 1905, she received her wish when was dispatched to Kenya alongside four of her colleagues and two nuns from the Consolata Missionaries, departing on 28 January 1905 (the third expedition of sisters to the African continent) from Trieste, receiving the missionary cross before her departure from the Cardinal Archbishop of Turin Agostino Richelmy. Upon their arrival in Mombasa after a two-week journey, the sisters were asked to manage the mission stations and were told that it was important to understand how to best teach catechism and practice medicine, while availing themselves to teach reading and writing to children. Despite the series of difficulties that she would face in this period, amongst them the differences in climate, standard of living, culture and language, Cecchin and her colleagues were able to collaborate with the Consolata Missionaries and learn together alongside them. Soon enough, Cecchin was able to study the Kikuyu language and could eventually communicate far more fluently than when she first arrived. First stationed in Limuru and then at Tuthu, she was also sent to Ichagaki, Mugoiri, Wambogo, and then finally to Tigania in Meru. Each time she relocated to another place, she established a small house for those sisters that would arrive after her, and she sought to make it habitable by creating a vegetable garden and creating a small courtyard. Known for her zeal in promoting the Gospel, she worked tirelessly to teach catechism, not just to children, but to the older population. The majority of her time was spent tending to the poor and the ill. However, World War I also had repercussions that spread to Africa, with Cecchin tending to soldiers at military hospitals, and later tending to those who suffered from the Spanish flu after the war ended. Cecchin was later appointed as the regional superior, and she fell seriously ill at her last community placement in Tigania, diagnosed as sanguine enterocolitis, which caused her great pain until her death. However, her trials were only further exacerbated after the fruitful collaboration with the Consolata Missionaries noticeably soured from 1923 due to differences in the style of evangelisation, amongst others. Following several unsuccessful attempts by the order's superiors, Pope Benedict XV decided to end the situation by formally ordering the repatriation of the Cottolengo sisters in Kenya, ensuring that the Vicar Apostolic of Kenya, Filippo Perlo, carry out the request and inform the sisters. Cecchin oversaw their departure, being the last of the 44 sisters (she left with just one other colleague) to leave on 25 October 1925, despite her seriously ill state.

Cecchin died on board the steamship Porto Alessandretta on 13 November 1925 in the Red Sea between Massawa and Suez. Her remains were never interred because, due to hygiene regulations at that time, her remains were wrapped in a simple white sheet and buried at sea after a hasty funeral could be organised.

== Beatification process ==
The beatification process launched on 28 February 2013 after the Congregation for the Causes of Saints issued the official nihil obstat ("no objections") that permitted the Turin archdiocese to launch the diocesan investigation into her life and holiness once it transferred the beatification forum from the Diocese of Meru to the Turin archdiocese. The diocesan investigation opened on 24 April 2014 in a Mass that Archbishop Cesare Nosiglia celebrated before the same archbishop presided over the conclusion of the process just a few months later on 7 October. The Congregation issued a decree on 28 May 2015 that validated the process that affirmed that all evidence had been presented to them and that the Turin archdiocese had carried out the process per the regulations that the Congregation set.

The postulator, Antonietta Bosetti SSGBC, lodged the positio with the Congregation in 2017 to be assessed. Historians assessed and approved the cause on 10 October 2017, before nine theologians likewise issued their approval on 4 February 2020. The cardinal and bishop members of the C.C.S. issued their final approval on 10 November 2020. Pope Francis declared Cecchin to be venerable on 23 November 2020 after he determined that she had led a life of heroic virtue. Francis later approved a 2013 miracle attributed to Cecchin's intercession in a decree on 13 December 2021 that would enable her to be beatified in Meru on 5 November 2022; Cardinal Antoine Kambanda presided over the rite on the pope's behalf.

During the Wednesday General Audience on 9 November 2022, Pope Francis asked the audience to give a round of applause for the new Blessed, noting that her example as a "wise and good woman, sustains many who work hard in spreading the reign of God".
