= Salesius Mugambi =

Kenyan Catholic prelate (born 1951)

The Most Reverend Salesius Mugambi
- Bishop Emeritus of Meru, Kenya
- Church: Catholic Church
- Archdiocese: Roman Catholic Archdiocese of Nyeri
- See: Diocese of Meru
- Appointed: 1 December 2001
- Installed: 19 March 2002
- Term ended: 1 January 2026
- Predecessor: Silas Silvius Njiru
- Successor: Jackson Murugara
- Other posts: Coadjutor Bishop of Meru, Kenya (1 December 2001 - 18 March 2004)

Orders
- Ordination: 10 December 1977
- Consecration: 19 March 2002 by Giovanni Tonucci
- Rank: Bishop

Personal details
- Born: Salesius Mugambi; 1 January 1951 (age 75) Egandene, Apostolic Prefecture of Meru, Kenya

Styles of Salesius Mugambi
- Reference style: Your Grace; The Most Reverend
- Spoken style: His Grace
- Religious style: Bishop

Salesius Mugambi (born 1 January 1951) is a Kenyan Catholic prelate who served as the Bishop of the Roman Catholic Diocese of Meru between the years 2002 and 2025. He was appointed bishop of Meru on 1 December 2001 by Pope John Paul II. On 1 January 2026, having attained the mandatory retirement age for Catholic bishops, he retired from pastoral care of Meru Diocese. He was succeeded the same day by Bishop Jackson Murugara, previously Coadjutor bishop at Meru.

== Background and education ==
He was born on 1 January 1951, at Egandene, Apostolic Prefecture of Meru, in Meru County, Central Kenya. He studied philosophy and Theology before he was ordained into priesthood on 10 December 1977.

== Priest ==
He was ordained a priest of the Diocese of Meru on 10 December 1977. He served in that capacity until 1 December 2001.

== As bishop ==
On 1 December 2001, Pope John Paul II appointed him as Coadjutor Bishop of the Roman Catholic Diocese of Meru, to deputize Bishop Silas Silvius Njiru. He was consecrated and installed at the Kinoru Stadium, in Meru, Diocese of Meru. The Principal Consecrator was Archbishop Giovanni Tonucci, Titular Archbishop of Torcello assisted by Bishop Silas Silvius Njiru, Bishop of Meru and Archbishop John Njue, Coadjutor Archbishop of Nyeri.

On 18 March 2004, Bishop Silas Silvius Njiru, the Ordinary of the Diocese of Meru retired. Bishop Salesius Mugambi succeeded as bishop there on that day. He continued to serve as the Bishop of Meru, Kenya since then.

On 1 January 2026, Bishop Mugambi attained the mandatory retirement age for Catholic bishops. Bishop Jackson Murugara, previously the Coadjutor bishop at Meru, succeeded him that same day.

== See also ==
- Catholic Church in Kenya

== Succession table ==
Catholic Church titles
Preceded by	Coadjutor Bishop of Meru (1 December 2001 - 18 March 2004)	Succeeded by
Preceded by Silas Silvius Njiru (9 December 1976 - 18 March 2004)	Bishop of Meru (18 March 2004 - 1 January 2026)	Succeeded by Jackson Murugara (since 1 January 2026)
