= Peter Munguti Makau =

Kenyan Catholic prelate (born 1975)

The Most Reverend Peter Munguti Makau
- Bishop of Isiolo, Kenya
- Church: Catholic Church
- Archdiocese: Roman Catholic Archdiocese of Nyeri
- See: Isiolo
- Appointed: 4 May 2024
- Installed: 27 July 2024
- Predecessor: Anthony Ireri Mukobo
- Successor: Incumbent

Orders
- Ordination: 20 November 2004
- Consecration: 27 July 2024 by Hubertus Matheus Maria van Megen

Personal details
- Born: Peter Munguti Makau; 6 May 1975 (age 51) Nairobi, Archdiocese of Nairobi, Kenya
- Motto: Console, console my people (Consolamini, consolamini populum meum)

Peter Munguti Makau I.M.C., (born 6 May 1975) is a Kenyan Roman Catholic prelate who is the Bishop of the Roman Catholic Diocese of Isiolo, Kenya since 2024. He served as Coadjutor Bishop of the same diocese from May 2024 until he succeeded as the Ordinary in September 2024. He was appointed bishop on 4 May 2024 by Pope Francis.

== Early life and education ==
He was born on 6 May 1975 in Nairobi, in the Archdiocese of Nairobi, in Kenya. He joined the Order of the Consolata Missionaries in Nairobi. He studied at the Consolata Seminary Nairobi, where he completed his postulancy and philosophy studies. He then transferred to the Consolata Novitiate of Sagana in the Catholic Diocese of Muranga, in Kenya, where he completed his novitiate.

He studied theology at the Saint Eugène de Mazenod Institute, in Kinshasa, Democratic Republic of the Congo (DRC). He also holds a Diploma in Canon Law from the Universidad Monteávila in Caracas, Venezuela.

== Priest ==
He took his first vows as a Consolata Missionary on 6 August 1999. He then took his perpetual vows on 5 December 2003. He was ordained a priest of the Consolata Missionaries on 20 November 2004 in the Catholic Diocese of Machakos. He served in that capacity until 4 May 2024.

As a priest, he served in various roles, including as:

- Parish Priest in Carapita Parish, Catholic Archdiocese of Caracas, Venezuela from 2006 until 2014.
- Superior Delegate for Venezuela for two mandates from 2014 until 2019.
- Regional Superior of the Consolata Missionaries in Kenya and Uganda from 2019 until 2024.

== Bishop ==
On 4 May 2024 Pope Francis appointed him Coadjutor Bishop of the Roman Catholic Diocese of Isiolo, to deputize and study Bishop Anthony Ireri Mukobo, I.M.C., who was approaching age-related retirement.

He was consecrated and installed at the grounds of St. Eusebius Cathedral Isiolo, at Isiolo, in the Diocese of Isiolo on 27 July 2024. The Principal Consecrator was Archbishop Hubertus Matheus Maria van Megen, Titular Archbishop of Novaliciana assisted by Archbishop Anthony Muheria, Archbishop of Nyeri and Bishop Anthony Ireri Mukobo, Bishop of Isiolo.

In September 2024, The Holly Father accepted the age-related retirement request from pastoral responsibility of the Diocese of Isiolo, presented by Anthony Ireri Mukobo the Ordinary of the diocese. Pope Francis allowed the Coadjutor Bishop Peter Munguti Makau to succeed as Ordinary on 28 September 2024.

== See also ==
- Catholic Church in Kenya

== Succession table ==
Catholic Church titles
| Preceded by | Coadjutor Bishop of Isiolo; 4 May 2024 - 28 September 2024) | Succeeded by |
| Preceded by Anthony Ireri Mukobo (25 January 2006 - 28 September 2024) | Bishop of Isiolo (since 28 September 2024) | Succeeded by Incumbent |
