= Jackson Murugara =

Kenyan Catholic prelate (born 1970)

The Most Reverend Jackson Murugara
- Bishop of Meru, Kenya
- Church: Catholic Church
- Archdiocese: Roman Catholic Archdiocese of Nyeri
- See: Diocese of Meru
- Appointed: 16 January 2025
- Installed: 19 March 2025
- Successor: Incumbent
- Previous posts: Parish priest and Rector of the Consolata Shrine in Westlands (Consolata Missionaries), Roman Catholic Archdiocese of Nairobi, Kenya; Coadjutor Bishop of Meru (16 January 2025 - 1 January 2026)

Orders
- Ordination: 15 August 2001
- Consecration: 19 March 2025 by Hubertus van Megen, Philip Arnold Subira Anyolo and Salesius Mugambi

Personal details
- Born: Jackson Murugara; 7 April 1970 (age 56) Kamanyaki, Tharaka-Nithi County, Diocese of Meru, Kenya
- Motto: Good must be done well in silence

Styles of Jackson Murugara
- Reference style: His Excellency, The Most Reverend
- Spoken style: Your Excellency
- Religious style: Bishop

Ordination history of Jackson Murugara
History
Episcopal consecration
- Principal consecrator: Hubertus van Megen
- Co-consecrators: Philip Arnold Subira Anyolo and Salesius Mugambi

Jackson Murugara I.M.C., (born 7 April 1970) is a Kenyan Roman Catholic prelate who is the Bishop of the Roman Catholic Diocese of Meru, Kenya. He is a member of the Order of the Consolata Missionaries. He was appointed bishop on 16 January 2025 by Pope Francis. He was consecrated and installed at Meru, Diocese of Meru on 19 March 2025. He succeeded as local ordinary at Meru on 1 January 2026, following the age-related retirement of Bishop Salesius Mugambi.

== Early life and education ==
He was born on 7 April 1970 at Kamanyaki, Tharaka-Nithi County, in the Diocese of Meru, in Kenya. He attended the Muthitwa Primary School, from 1981 until 1988. He then transferred to Mitiri Boys' School, before he entered St. Pius X Minor Seminary Nkubu in Nkubu, Meru County, where he studied from 1990 until 1992. He holds a degree in Philosophy and Religious Studies, awarded by the Consolata Institute of Philosophy, in Nairobi. He also graduated with another degree from the Pontifical Urban University. From 1997 until 2001, he studied Theology at the Missionary Institute of London, affiliated with Middlesex University.

== Priest ==
He took his perpetual vows as a member of the Consolata Missionaries on 18 November 2000. He was ordained priest of the Consolata Missionaries on 15 August 2001. He served in that capacity until 16 January 2025.

Following his ordination, he served in various roles including as:

- Collaborator in Kagaene Parish, Meru Diocese from 2001 until 2002
- Collaborator in Mujwa Parish, Meru Diocese from 2001 until 2002
- Parish Vicar in Chiga Parish, Catholic Archdiocese of Kisumu from 2002 until 2003
- Formator of postulants at the Consolata Seminary in Nairobi from 2003 until 2009.
- Director of the Bethany House and Charity Home pastoral centres in the Diocese of Muranga from 2011 until 2018.
- Parish priest and Rector of the Consolata Shrine in Westlands, Archdiocese of Nairobi, Kenya from 2018 until 2025.

== Bishop ==
On 16 January 2025 Pope Francis appointed him Coadjutor Bishop of the Roman Catholic Diocese of Meru, to work with and later succeed Bishop Salesius Mugambi, at that time the Ordinary of Meru Catholic Diocese. His consecration and installation were scheduled for 19 March 2025 at Meru.

He was consecrated and installed at Kinoru Stadium, Meru, Diocese of Meru on 19 March 2025. The Principal Consecrator was Archbishop Hubertus Matheus Maria van Megen, Titular Archbishop of Novaliciana assisted by Archbishop Philip Arnold Subira Anyolo, Archbishop of Nairobi and Bishop Salesius Mugambi, Bishop of Meru.

On 1 January 2026, Bishop Salesius Mugambi retired, having attained the mandatory retirement age for Catholic Bishops. That same day, Bishop Jackson Murugara, previously Coadjutor bishop, succeeded as local ordinary at Meru.

== See also ==
- Catholic Church in Kenya

== Succession table ==
Catholic Church titles
Preceded by	Coadjutor Bishop of Meru (16 January 2025 - 1 January 2026)	Succeeded by
Preceded by Salesius Mugambi (1 December 2001 - 1 January 2026)	Bishop of Meru (since 1 January 2026)	Succeeded by (Incumbent)
