= Anthony Ireri Mukobo =

Kenyan Catholic prelate

The Most Reverend Anthony Ireri Mukobo
- Bishop of Isiolo, Kenya
- Church: Catholic Church
- Archdiocese: Roman Catholic Archdiocese of Nyeri
- See: Nakuru
- Appointed: 15 February 2023
- Installed: 22 April 2023
- Predecessor: Luigi Locati
- Successor: Peter Munguti Makau

Orders
- Ordination: 5 January 1980
- Consecration: 18 March 2000 by Jozef Cardinal Tomko
- Rank: Bishop

Personal details
- Born: Anthony Ireri Mukobo; 23 September 1949 (age 76) Mufu, Apostolic Prefecture of Meru, Meru County, Kenya

Styles of Anthony Ireri Mukobo
- Reference style: Your Grace; The Most Reverend
- Spoken style: His Grace
- Religious style: Bishop

Anthony Ireri Mukobo I.M.C., (born 23 September 1949) is a Kenyan Catholic prelate who served as the Bishop of the Roman Catholic Diocese of Isiolo from February 2023 until his age-related retirement in September 2024. Before that, from January 2006 until February 2023, he was the Apostolic Vicar of the Diocese of Isiolo. Prior to Isiolo, he was an Auxiliary Bishop of the Archdiocese of Nairobi from December 1999 until January 2006. He was appointed bishop on 22 December 1999 by Pope John Paul II. He retired in 2024, having attained the retirement age of 75 years. He now lives as the Bishop Emeritus of Isiolo, Kenya.

== Background and education ==
He was born on 23 September 1949 in Mufu Village, in the Apostolic Prefecture of Meru, in Kenya. After studying philosophy and theology he was ordained a priest on 5 January 1980.

== Priest ==
He was ordained a priest of the Consolata Missionaries on 5 January 1980. He served in that capacity until 22 December 1999.

== As bishop ==
On 22 December 1999, Pope John Paul II appointed him as Auxiliary Bishop of the Roman Catholic Archdiocese of Nairobi. He was contemporaneously appointed as Titular Bishop of Rusguniae. He was consecrated and installed at Nairobi in the archdiocese of Nairobi on 18 March 2000. The Principal Consecrator was Jozef Cardinal Tomko, Cardinal-Priest of Santa Sabina assisted by Archbishop Giovanni Tonucci, Titular Archbishop of Torcello and Archbishop Raphael Simon Ndingi Mwana'a Nzeki, Archbishop of Nairobi.

On 25 January 2006, he was appointed Apostolic Vicar of the Vicariate of Isiolo. On 15 February 2023 Pope Francis elevated the vicariate to a full diocese and he appointed Bishop Mukobo as the pioneer Ordinary there. He was installed at Isiolo on 22 April 2023.

On 28 September 2024, having attained the retirement age of 75 years, he retired and was succeeded by Bishop Peter Munguti Makau, I.M.C., a Consolata Missionary and previously Coadjutor Bishop of Isiolo. Bishop Anthony Ireri Mukobo I.M.C., lives on as the Bishop Emeritus of Isiolo, Kenya.

== See also ==
- Catholic Church in Kenya

== Succession table ==
Catholic Church titles
Preceded by	Auxiliary Bishop of Nairobi (22 December 1999 - 25 January 2006)	Succeeded by
Preceded by	Apostolic Vicar of Isiolo (25 January 2006 - 15 February 2023)	Succeeded by
Preceded by Luigi Locati (15 December 1995 - 14 July 2005)	Bishop of Isiolo (15 February 2023 - 28 September 2024)	Succeeded by Peter Munguti Makau (since 28 September 2024)
