= Peter Kihara Kariuki =

Kenyan Catholic prelate

The Most Reverend Peter Kihara Kariuki
- Bishop of Marsabit, Kenya
- Church: Catholic Church
- Archdiocese: Roman Catholic Archdiocese of Nyeri
- See: Marsabit
- Appointed: 25 November 2006
- Installed: 25 January 2007
- Predecessor: Ambrogio Ravasi
- Successor: Incumbent
- Previous post: Bishop of Muranga (3 June 1999 - 25 November 2006)

Orders
- Ordination: 16 December 1983
- Consecration: 11 September 1999 by Giovanni Tonucci

Personal details
- Born: Peter Kihara Kariuki; 6 February 1954 (age 72) Thunguri, Kirinyaga County, Kenya

Peter Kihara Kariuki I.M.C. (born 6 February 1954) is a Kenyan Roman Catholic prelate who is the Bishop of the Roman Catholic Diocese of Marsabit, Kenya since 2006. He previously served as the Bishop of the Roman Catholic Diocese of Muranga, from 1999 until 2006. He was appointed bishop on 3 June 1999 by Pope John Paul II.

== Early life and education ==
He was born in Thunguri, Kirinyaga County, Kenya, on 6 February 1954. After studying philosophy and Theology, he was ordained a priest in 1983.

== Priest ==
He was ordained priest of the Consolata Missionaries on 16 December 1983. He served in that capacity until 3 June 1999.

== Bishop ==
On 3 June 1999 The Holy Father John Paul II appointed him Bishop of the Roman Catholic Diocese of Muranga. On 11 September 1999, he was consecrated and installed at Muranga by the hands of Archbishop Giovanni Tonucci, Titular Archbishop of Torcello assisted by Archbishop Nicodemus Kirima, Archbishop of Nyeri and Bishop John Njue, Bishop of Embu.

On 25 November 2006 Pope Benedict XVI accepted the age-related resignation from pastoral duties of Bishop Ambrogio Ravasi, I.M.C., as Ordinary of Marsabit Diocese. On the same day, The Holy Father appointed Bishop Peter Kihara Kariuki, of Muranga Diocese to succeed the retiring prelate. Bishop Peter Kihara Kariuki, I.M.C. was installed as the Ordinary of the diocese of Marsabit on 25 January 2007. He continues to serve in that capacity as of 2024.

== See also ==
- Catholic Church in Kenya

== Succession table ==
Catholic Church titles
Preceded by Peter Joseph Kairo (17 March 1983 - 21 April 1997)	Bishop of Muranga (3 June 1999 - 25 November 2006)	Succeeded by James Maria Wainaina Kungu
Preceded by Ambrogio Ravasi (19 June 1981 - 25 November 2006)	Bishop of Marsabit (Since 25 November 2006)	Succeeded by Incumbent
