= Diocese of Isiolo =

Latin Catholic diocese in Kenya

Diocese of Isiolo Dioecesis Isiolansus Jimbo Katoliki la Isiolo

Catholic

Location
- Country: Kenya
- Episcopal conference: Kenya Conference of Catholic Bishops
- Metropolitan: Archdiocese of Nyeri
- Headquarters: Isiolo, Kenya

Statistics
- Area: 25,336 km^{2} (9,782 sq mi)
- Population: Total; Catholics: (as of 2023); 177,730; 69,070 (38.9%)
- Parishes: 14

Information
- Denomination: Catholic Church
- Sui iuris church: Latin Church
- Rite: Roman Rite
- Established: 15 December 1995; 30 years ago
- Cathedral: St. Eusebius Cathedral in Isiolo
- Secular priests: 21 diocesan; 5 religious (2023)

Current leadership
- Pope: Leo XIV
- Bishop: Peter Munguti Makau
- Metropolitan Archbishop: Anthony Muheria
- Bishops emeritus: Anthony Ireri Mukobo

Website
- cdisiolo.org

The Diocese of Isiolo is a Latin Church diocese of the Catholic Church in the Eastern Province, Kenya.

Its episcopal see is in Isiolo, where the St. Eusebius Cathedral is located.

== History ==
The Apostolic Vicariate of Isiolo (Vicariatus Apostolicus Isiolansus) was created on 15 December 1995 on territory split off from the Diocese of Meru in Eastern Province, Kenya.

On February 15, 2023, Pope Francis elevated the vicariate to the Diocese of Isiolo and appointed Anthony Ireri Mukobo as its first bishop.

== Statistics ==
As of 2023, the diocese serves 69,070 Catholics (38.9% of 177,730 total) on an area of 25,336 square kilometres (9,782 sq mi), in 14 parishes with 26 priests (21 diocesan, 5 religious), 84 lay religious (6 male, 78 female) and 12 seminarians.

== Episcopal ordinaries ==
Apostolic Vicars of Isiolo

- Luigi Locati (born Italy) (15 Dec 1995 – death 14 July 2005 fatally shot during an attempted robbery), Titular Bishop of Zica (15 Dec 1995 – 14 Jul 2005)
  - Apostolic Administrator John Njue (2005 – 25 Jan 2006)
- Anthony Ireri Mukobo (first native incumbent) (25 Jan 2006 – 15 Feb 2023); see below

Bishops of Isiolo

- Anthony Ireri Mukobo, (15 Feb 2023 – 28 Sep 2024), retired
- Peter Munguti Makau, (28 Sep 2024 – Present)

== See also ==
- List of Catholic dioceses in Kenya
