= Ambrogio Ravasi =

Italian-born Kenyan Roman Catholic bishop (1929–2020)

The Most Reverend Ambrogio Ravasi, I.M.C.
- Bishop Emeritus of Marsabit, Kenya (Deceased)
- Church: Catholic Church
- Archdiocese: Roman Catholic Archdiocese of Nyeri
- See: Marsabit
- Appointed: 19 June 1981
- Installed: 18 October 1981
- Term ended: 25 November 2006
- Predecessor: Charles (Carlo) Maria Cavallera
- Successor: Peter Kihara Kariuki

Orders
- Ordination: 9 February 1957 by Amleto Giovanni Cicognani
- Consecration: 18 October 1981 by Cardinal Maurice Michael Otunga
- Rank: Bishop

Personal details
- Born: Ambrogio Ravasi; February 7, 1929 Bellusco, Archdiocese of Milan, Italy
- Died: 30 October 2020 (aged 91) Hospital in Nairobi, Kenya

Styles of Ambrogio Ravasi
- Reference style: Your Lordship; The Most Reverend
- Spoken style: His Lordship
- Religious style: Bishop

Ambrogio Ravasi, I.M.C. (7 February 1929 – 30 October 2020) was an Italian-born Kenyan Roman Catholic prelate who was the Bishop of the Roman Catholic Diocese of Marsabit from 1981 until 2006. He was appointed bishop on 19 June 1981 by Pope John Paul II. His age-related resignation as bishop took effect on 25 November 2006. He died on 30 October 2020 as Bishop Emeritus of Marsabit. He was 91 years old at the time.

== Early life and education ==
He was born on 7 February 1929 in Bellusco, in the Archdiocese of Milan, in Italy.

== Priest ==
He was ordained a priest of the Consolata Missionaries on 9 February 1957, in Washington, DC, Archdiocese of Washington, District of Columbia, United States by Archbishop Amleto Giovanni Cicognani, Titular Archbishop of Laodicea in Phrygia.

== Bishop ==
On 19 June 1981 The Holy Father John Paul II appointed him Bishop of Marsabit, Kenya. He was consecrated Bishop on 18 October 1981 at Bellusco, in the Archdiocese of Milan in Italy. The Principal Consecrator was Cardinal Maurice Michael Otunga, Archbishop of Nairobi assisted by Bishop Caesar Gatimu, Bishop of Nyeri and Bishop Ferdinando Maggioni, Bishop of Alessandria (della Paglia). He retired as bishop on 25 November 2006, having reached the retirement age in 2004. He was succeeded by Bishop Peter Kihara Kariuki, I.M.C. as the Ordinary of the diocese. Bishop Ambrogio Ravasi continued to stay in Marsabit as Bishop Emeritus, as he so chose.

== Illness and death ==
He fell down and broke one of his hip joints, several weeks before his death. He was taken to a hospital so that his broken hip could be operated upon. While there, he was found to have an emergency heart condition that required an operation, which was done. His doctors gave him one month to recover from the heart operation before they could fix the broken hip. He was moved to Consolata Missionaries Regional House in Nairobi, Kenya's capital city.

While there, his condition deteriorated and he had to be re-admitted to hospital. He died there on the morning of 30 October 2020, at the age of 91 years. On 6 November 2006, he was buried at the Maria Mfariji (Mary the Consoler) Shrine in Marsabit, as he had willed.

== See also ==
- Catholic Church in Kenya

== Succession table ==
Catholic Church titles
Preceded by Charles Maria Cavallera, I.M.C. (25 November 1964 - 19 June 1981)	Bishop of Marsabit (19 June 1981 - 25 November 2006)	Succeeded by Peter Kihara Kariuki I.M.C.
