= Silas Silvius Njiru =

Kenyan Catholic prelate (1928 - 2020)

The Most Reverend Silas Silvius Njiru
- Bishop Emeritus of Meru, Kenya (Deceased)
- Church: Catholic Church
- Archdiocese: Roman Catholic Archdiocese of Nyeri
- See: Meru
- Appointed: 9 December 1976
- Installed: 9 December 1976
- Term ended: 18 March 2004
- Predecessor: Lorenzo Bessone
- Successor: Salesius Mugambi
- Other post: Auxiliary Bishop of the Roman Catholic Diocese of Meru (2 October 1975 - 9 December 1976)

Orders
- Ordination: 17 December 1955
- Consecration: 1 January 1976 by Cardinal Maurice Michael Otunga
- Rank: Bishop

Personal details
- Born: Silas Silvius Njiru; October 10, 1928 Kevote, Embu County, Kenya
- Died: 28 April 2020 (aged 91) Rivoli Hospital, Rivoli, Italy
- Buried: Consolata Missionaries Cemetery, Turin, Archdiocese of Turin, Italy

Styles of Silas Silvius Njiru
- Reference style: Your Grace; The Most Reverend
- Spoken style: His Grace
- Religious style: Bishop

Silas Silvius Njiru (10 October 1928 - 28 April 2020) was a Kenyan Roman Catholic prelate who served as the Bishop of the Roman Catholic Diocese of Meru from 1976 until his age-related retirement in 2004. Before that, from 1975 until 1976, he was an Auxiliary Bishop of Meru Diocese, deputizing Bishop Lorenzo Bessone who died in 1976. Bishop Emeritus Njiru died on 28 April 2020 in Rivoli, Italy from complications of COVID-19. He was 91 years old.

== Early life ==
He was born on 10 October 1928 at Kevote, Kenya in the Diocese of Meru. He studied philosophy and theology before he was ordained a priest in 1955.

== Priest ==
On 17 December 1955, he was ordained a priest of Meru Diocese, Kenya. He served in that capacity until 2 October 1975.

== Bishop ==
On 2 October 1975, Pope Paul VI appointed him Auxiliary Bishop of Meru Diocese. He was concurrently named Titular Bishop of Maturba. He was consecrated on 1 January 1976 at Meru Stadium, in Meru, Diocese of Meru. The Principal Consecrator was Cardinal Maurice Michael Otunga, Archbishop of Nairobi assisted by Bishop Lorenzo Bessone, Bishop of Meru and Bishop Caesar Gatimu, Bishop of Nyeri.

Following the death of Bishop Lorenzo Bessone on 7 April 1976, The Holly Father, appointed Bishop Silas Silvius Njiru to succeed him as the Ordinary for Meru Diocese on 9 December 1976. He served there until he retired on 18 March 2004, having attained the retirement age of 75 years, the previous October.

== Illness and death ==
As Bishop Emeritus of Meru, Kenya, he retired to the Blessed Joseph Allamano House in Alpignano, Turin Italy. While a resident there during the Spring of 2020, he was afflicted with COVID-19. On 28 April 2020, he died in a hospital in Rivoli, Italy, during the COVID-19 pandemic in Italy from complications of that disease. He was 91 years old. His remains were buried in the Consolata Missionaries Cemetery, in the city of Turin, Archdiocese of Turin, Italy.

== See also ==
- Catholic Church in Kenya

== Succession table ==
Catholic Church titles
Preceded by	Auxiliary Bishop of Meru (2 October 1975 - 9 December 1976)	Succeeded by
Preceded by Lorenzo Bessone (3 March 1954 - 7 April 1976)	Bishop of Meru (9 December 1976 - 18 March 2004)	Succeeded by Salesius Mugambi
