= Joseph Ndembu Mbatia =

Kenyan Catholic prelate (born 1961)

The Most Reverend Joseph Ndembu Mbatia
- Bishop of Nyahururu, Kenya
- Church: Catholic Church
- Archdiocese: Roman Catholic Archdiocese of Nyeri
- See: Roman Catholic Diocese of Nyahururu
- Appointed: 24 December 2011
- Installed: 24 March 2012
- Predecessor: Luigi Paiaro
- Successor: Incumbent

Orders
- Ordination: 18 February 1990
- Consecration: 24 March 2012 by John Cardinal Njue
- Rank: Bishop

Personal details
- Born: Joseph Ndembu Mbatia; 10 May 1961 (age 64); Itabua, Embu County, Kenya

Styles of Joseph Ndembu Mbatia
- Reference style: Your Grace; The Most Reverend
- Spoken style: His Grace
- Religious style: Bishop

Joseph Ndembu Mbatia (born 10 May 1961) is a Kenyan Roman Catholic prelate who serves as the Bishop of the Roman Catholic Diocese of Nyahururu. He was appointed bishop of Nyahururu on 24 December 2011 by Pope Benedict XVI.

== Background and education ==
He was born on 10 May 1961, at Itabua, Embu County in the Diocese of Nyeri. He studied philosophy and theology before he was ordained into priesthood on 18 February 1989.

== Priest ==
He was ordained a priest of the Diocese of Nyeri on 18 February 1989. He was incardinated a priest of the Diocese of Nyahururu, Kenya in March 2003. He served in that capacity until 24 December 2011.

== As bishop ==
On 24 December 2011, Pope Benedict XVI appointed him as Bishop of the Roman Catholic Diocese of Nyahururu. He was consecrated and installed at Nyahururu in the Diocese of Nyahururu on 24 March 2012. The Principal Consecrator was John Cardinal Njue, Archbishop of Nairobi assisted by Archbishop Peter Joseph Kairo, Archbishop of Nyeri and Bishop Luigi Paiaro, Bishop Emeritus of Nyahururu. He succeeded Bishop Liugi Paiaro who retired, having reached the retirement age. Bishop Mbatia continues to serve as the Ordinary for Nyahururu.

In April 2024, the members of the Kenya Conference of Catholic Bishops (KCCB), elected Bishop Joseph Ndembu Mbatia as the vice-chairman of the conference's Commission for Interreligious Dialogue and Ecumenism (CIRDE). He deputizes the chairman of that commission, Bishop Willybard Kitogho Lagho of Malindi Diocese, until the next elections in 2027.

== See also ==
- Catholic Church in Kenya

== Succession table ==
Catholic Church titles
| Preceded by Luigi Paiaro (4 January 2003 - 24 December 2011) | Bishop of Nyahururu (since 24 December 2011) | Succeeded by Incumbent |
