= Gianni Danzi =

Italian Catholic Archbishop

Gianni Danzi (25 January 1940 – 2 October 2007) was an Italian Catholic Archbishop of the Territorial Prelature of Loreto. He was born in Viggiù, Varese province, Italy. Danzi died in October 2007 at the age of 67 at his parents' house in Barasso after a long fight with cancer.

Gianni Danzi was born in Viggiù on 25 January 1940. He was ordained a priest of Lugano, Switzerland. on 17 December 1966. On 2 May 1996, he was appointed Secretary of the Governatorate of Vatican City State, and on 5 May 1996, he was appointed Titular Bishop of Castello. He was ordained Bishop on 24 May 1996. On 22 February, he was appointed Archbishop (Personal Title) of Loreto, Italy. He died on 2 October 2007.

Preceded by Angelo Comastri	Prelate of Loreto; 22 February 2005 – 2 October 2007	Succeeded by Giovanni Tonucci
