= Meru Twin Towers =

- Interactive map of the Meru Twin Towers area

General information
- Type: Mixed Use
- Location: Meru, Meru County; Kenya
- Coordinates: 00°02′32″N 37°39′13″E
- Construction started: 2019 Expected
- Completed: 2024 Expected

Technical details
- Floor count: 30

Meru Twin Towers, also Meru Church Towers, or Meru Destiny Towers, is a real estate development, planned in the town of Meru, the county seat of Meru County in the Eastern part of Kenya. The mixed use twin towers are owned by the developers, the Jesus House of Praise International Church.

== Location ==
The skyscraper would be located approximately 1.6 kilometres (1 mi), by road, south of the central business district of Meru Town, along the Meru–Embu–Nairobi Road. This is approximately 225 kilometres (140 mi), by road, north-east of Nairobi, the capital city of Kenya. The location sits immediately south of River Kathita, to the east of the road, as you approach Meru from Embu. The coordinates of the building are: 0°02'32.0"N, 37°39'13.0"E (Latitude:0.042222; Longitude:37.653611).

== Overview ==
The construction site measures approximately 1 acre (0.40 ha). The building is expected to comprise retail stores, office spaces, serviced apartments, hotels, a gymnasium and a swimming pool. Two basement floors are expected to accommodate up to 200 parked automobiles. In addition, there will be Church halls, conference facilities, meeting rooms and related facilities, including restaurants, and a supermarket.

The project has been cleared by the Water Resource Users Association (WRUA) and has been endorsed by Kevin Musiega, of Lakers Consultancy Limited, who carried out the Environmental And Social Impact Assessment Study (EASIA Study).

== Construction costs ==
As of November 2018, construction costs are budgeted at KSh4.52 billion (US$45.2 million).

== See also ==
- List of counties in Kenya
