= Ravasio =

Ravasio is a surname. Notable people with the surname include:

- Eugenia Ravasio (1907–1990), Italian Roman Catholic nun, visionary, and mystic
- Mario Ravasio (born 1998), Italian footballer

== See also ==
- Ravasi
