= Isiolo Airport =

Isiolo Airport Isiolo International Airport
- IATA: n/a; ICAO: HKIS

Summary
- Airport type: Public, Civilian
- Owner: Kenya Airports Authority
- Serves: Isiolo, Meru
- Location: Isiolo, Meru Kenya
- Elevation AMSL: 3,501 ft (1,067 m)
- Coordinates: 00°20′37″N 37°35′16″E

Map
- Location of Isiolo Airport in Kenya; Placement on map is approximate

Runways
Direction	Length		Surface
Direction	ft	m	Surface
16/34	5,000	2,500	Asphalt

Isiolo Airport (IATA: n/a, ICAO: HKIS), also Isiolo International Airport is an airport located in Isiolo, Isiolo County, and Meru County, Kenya.

== Location ==
Isiolo Airport is located on the border of Isiolo County and Meru County, with half of the runway extending into each county. Located approximately 283 kilometres (176 mi), by road, and about 200 kilometres (120 mi), by air, north-east of Jomo Kenyatta International Airport. The airport is 260 hectares (640 acres) in size with a passenger terminal building 5,000 square metres (54,000 sq ft) in area. The geographic coordinates of this airport are:0° 20' 37.00"N, 37° 35' 16.00"E (Latitude:0.343610; Longitude:37.587778).

== Overview ==
Isiolo Airport is a civilian airport, serving Isiolo, Meru and surrounding communities. Situated at 1,067 metres (3,501 ft) above sea level, with a single asphalt runway 16/34 2,500 metres (8,200 ft) long.

== Airlines and destinations ==
Isiolo is planning to become a resort city in Kenya, which would motivate airlines to fly here in the future. As of January 2018, according to the Airport manager, Mohamed Lippi, only one airline, Fly Sax Airlines, was operating from this airport, offering passenger flights only.

== See also ==
- Kenya Airports Authority
- Kenya Civil Aviation Authority
- List of airports in Kenya
