= Peter Kimani Ndung'u =

Kenyan Roman Catholic prelate (born 1966)

- Bishop of Embu
- Church: Roman Catholic Church
- Archdiocese: Nyeri
- Appointed: 15 August 2024
- Installed: 16 November 2024
- Predecessor: Paul Kariuki Njiru (Bishop: 9 May 2009 - 2 July 2023); Anthony Muheria (Apostolic Administrator: 30 September 2023 - 16 November 2024)
- Previous posts: Priest of Nairobi, Kenya (1995–2024) and National Chaplain of the Prison Service of Kenya (2001-2024).

Orders
- Ordination: 22 July 1995
- Consecration: 16 November 2024 by Hubertus Matheus Maria van Megen
- Rank: Bishop

Personal details
- Born: Peter Kimani Ndung'u; November 11, 1966 (age 59) Githunguri, Nairobi, Kenya

Styles of Peter Kimani Ndung'u
- Reference style
- Religious style: Bishop

Peter Kimani Ndung'u is a Roman Catholic prelate in Kenya, who was installed as the Bishop of the Roman Catholic Diocese of Embu, Kenya on 16 November 2024, by Archbishop Hubertus Matheus Maria van Megen, the Apostolic Nuncio to Kenya. Prior to his appointment as bishop, Monsignor Father Peter Kimani Ndung'u served as a priest of the Roman Catholic Archdiocese of Nairobi, Kenya. He was appointed bishop on 15 August 2024 by Pope Francis.

== Early life and education ==
He was born on 11 November 1966 in Githunguri, Kiambu District, in the Archdiocese of Nairobi. He studied for one preparatory year at St. Mary's Major Seminary in Molo. He then studied philosophy at the Apostles of Jesus Major Seminary in Nairobi, and theology at St. Thomas Aquinas Major Seminary in Nairobi.

He went on to graduate with a Diploma in Computer Science in 2002, followed by a Diploma in psychological support for the rehabilitation of prisoners, obtained in 2003. He updated the second diploma in 2015. Both qualifications were obtained from the United Nations Asia and Far East Institute for the Prevention of Crime and the Treatment of Offenders (UNAFEI), in Tokyo, Japan.

== Priesthood ==
He was ordained a priest on 22 July 1995 at Nairobi. He served as a priest of the Archdiocese of Nairobi. Over the years, he has served in various roles in the Catholic Church, including as:

- Assistant at the Saints Peter and Paul Catholic Church in Kiambu (1995-1999)
- Parish priest of the Holy Rosary in Kamwangi Parish (1999-2001)
- National Chaplain of the Kenya Prisons Service, Nairobi, Kenya
- Representative for Africa in the International Commission of Catholic Prison Pastoral Care (ICCPPC) (2008 to present).

== As bishop ==
On 15 August 2024 Pope Francis appointed Monsignor Peter Kimani Ndung'u as the Bishop of the Catholic Diocese of Embu. He was consecrated and installed bishop on 16 November 2024 by Archbishop Hubertus Matheus Maria van Megen, Titular Archbishop of Novaliciana and Apostolic Nuncio to Kenya. He was assisted by Archbishop Philip Arnold Subira Anyolo, Archbishop of Nairobi and Archbishop Anthony Muheria, Archbishop of Nyeri. In his maiden speech at his Episcopal Consecration, Bishop Ndung’u said that the "focus in families should be on youths and children who need spiritual guidance". The ceremony was held at Embu University Grounds, in Embu City, about 130 kilometres (81 mi) northeast of Kenya's capital city of Nairobi.

== See also ==
- Roman Catholicism in Kenya

== Succession table ==
Catholic Church titles
Preceded by Paul Kariuki Njiru (Bishop) (2009–2023)	Bishop of Roman Catholic Diocese of Embu; 2024 - present	Succeeded by Incumbent
