= Diocese of Embu =

Diocese of Embu may refer to:

- one of the Anglican dioceses of Mount Kenya
- Roman Catholic Diocese of Embu
