= Ravasi =

Ravasi is an Italian surname. Notable people with the surname include:

- Ambrogio Ravasi (1929–2020), Italian-born Kenyan Catholic bishop
- Edward Ravasi (born 1994), Italian cyclist
- Fabrizio Ravasi (born 1965), Italian rower
- Gianfranco Ravasi (born 1942), Italian cardinal
- Jacopo Ravasi (born 1987), Italian footballer
