= Roman Catholic Diocese of Nyahururu =

Roman Catholic diocese in Kenya

Diocese of Nyahururu Dioecesis Nyahururensis

Location
- Country: Kenya
- Metropolitan: Nyeri

Statistics
- Area: 8,066 km^{2} (3,114 sq mi)
- Population: Total; Catholics: (as of 2004); 672,918; 181,632 (27.0%)

Information
- Rite: Latin Rite
- Cathedral: Cathedral of Mary Immaculate

Current leadership
- Pope: Leo XIV
- Bishop: Joseph Ndembu Mbatia
- Bishops emeritus: Luigi Paiaro

The Roman Catholic Diocese of Nyahururu (Latin: Dioecesis Nyahururensis) is a diocese located in the city of Nyahururu in the ecclesiastical province of Nyeri in Kenya.

== History ==
- December 5, 2002: Established as Diocese of Nyahururu from the Metropolitan Archdiocese of Nyeri

== Bishops ==
- Bishops of Nyahururu (Latin Church)
  - Bishop Luigi Paiaro (4 January 2003 - 24 December 2011)
  - Bishop Joseph Ndembu Mbatia (since 24 December 2011)

=== Other priest of this diocese who became bishop ===
- James Maria Wainaina Kungu, appointed Bishop of Muranga in 2009

== See also ==
- Roman Catholicism in Kenya

== Sources ==
- GCatholic.org
- Catholic Hierarchy
