= James Maria Wainaina Kungu =

Kenyan Catholic prelate

The Most Reverend James Maria Wainaina Kungu
- Bishop of Muranga, Kenya
- Church: Catholic Church
- Archdiocese: Roman Catholic Archdiocese of Nyeri
- See: Muranga
- Appointed: 4 April 2009
- Installed: 27 June 2009
- Predecessor: Peter Kihara Kariuki
- Successor: Incumbent

Orders
- Ordination: 15 December 1984
- Consecration: 27 June 2009 by John Cardinal Njue
- Rank: Bishop

Personal details
- Born: James Maria Wainaina Kungu; 23 December 1956 (age 69) Ngenya, Kiambu County, Archdiocese of Nairobi, Kenya

Styles of James Maria Wainaina Kungu
- Reference style: Your Lordship; The Most Reverend
- Spoken style: His Lordship
- Religious style: Bishop

James Maria Wainaina Kungu (born 23 December 1956) is a Kenyan Catholic prelate who serves as the Bishop of the Roman Catholic Diocese of Muranga. He was appointed bishop of Muranga on 4 April 2009 by Pope Benedict XVI

== Background and education ==
He was born on 23 December 1956, at Ngenya, Kiambu County, in the Metropolitan Archdiocese of Nairobi, Kenya. He studied philosophy at the St. Augustine Major Seminary in Mabanga, in the Roman Catholic Diocese of Bungoma from 1978 until 1980. He then studied Theology at the St. Thomas Aquinas Seminary in Nairobi, in the Catholic Archdiocese of Nairobi from 1980 until 1984. He studied at the Pontifical University of Saint Anselm in Padua, Italy from 1996, graduating in 2001 with a Licentiate of Sacred Theology.

== Priest ==
He was ordained a priest of the Archdiocese of Nyeri on 15 December 1984. On 5 December 2002, he was Incardinated priest of Nyahururu Diocese, Kenya. He served in several roles as priest including as:

- Professor of St. Paul Minor Seminary in Nyeri from 1984 until 1986.
- Financial Administrator for the Archdiocese of Nyeri from 1984 until 1986.
- Professor of Liturgy at Christ the King Seminary from 2002 until 2003.
- Rector of Christ the King Major Seminary in Nyeri since 2003.

== As bishop ==
On 4 April 2009, Pope Benedict XVI appointed him as Bishop of the Roman Catholic Diocese of Muranga. He was consecrated and installed at the grounds of Muranga Catholic Cathedral, in Muranga. The Principal Consecrator was John Cardinal Njue, Archbishop of Nairobi assisted by Archbishop Peter Joseph Kairo, Archbishop of Nyeri and Bishop Luigi Paiaro, Bishop of Nyahururu. He serves there as the Ordinary of the diocese since.

== See also ==
- Catholic Church in Kenya

== Succession table ==
Catholic Church titles
Preceded by Peter Kihara Kariuki (3 June 1999 - 25 November 2006)	Bishop of Muranga (since 4 April 2009)	Succeeded by Incumbent
