= Eugene Joseph Butler =

Roman Catholic bishop

Eugene Joseph Butler C.S.Sp.
- Bishop of Mombasa
- Church: Catholic Church
- Diocese: Diocese of Mombasa
- In office: 26 January 1957 – 27 February 1978
- Predecessor: Diocese erected
- Successor: Nicodemus Kirima

Orders
- Ordination: 17 June 1928
- Consecration: 11 May 1957 by Daniel Mageean

Personal details
- Born: 23 October 1900 Belfast, County Antrim, United Kingdom of Great Britain and Ireland
- Died: 3 May 1981 (aged 80) Dublin, Republic of Ireland

Bishop Eugene Joseph Butler, C.S.Sp., (born 23 October 1900, Belfast – died 3 May 1981, Dublin) was an Irish born Spiritan priest who served as Bishop of Zanzibar (1957–1964) and Bishop of Mombasa (1964–1978).

He was born in St Peter's Parish in Belfast, and educated by the Christian brothers locally at St. Mary's Grammar School, leaving school at 16 he worked as a clerk, before going to Kimmage Manor, to train as a priest. He studied philosophy in St. Marys College, and prefected in Blackrock College studying Theology and was ordained a Holy Ghost Father in 1928. He was sent to East Africa where he taught, holding a number of church positions. In 1957 he was appointed Bishop of Mombasa and Zanzibar, consecrated in the church where he was baptised, St Peter's Pro-Cathedral in Belfast. From 1964 the Bishopric became Mombasa.

Bishop Butler resigned in 1978, and retired to Ireland and stayed in the Sacred Heart Residence of the Little Sisters of the Poor at Sybil Hill, Raheny. He died peacefully a few years later 3 May 1981 aged 80 years and was buried in Kimmage in the Spiritan plot, following his funeral there.
