= Kathita River =

River in Kenya

The Kathita River is a river in eastern Kenya is the longest river in Meru. The river flows in a north-easterly direction from a source high on Mount Kenya around Ithangune and Rutundu hills from where it flows easterly through thick equatorial rainforests towards Meru Town, and in a southeasterly direction into River Tana. It is the northernmost of the Mt. Kenya tributaries of the Tana River.

== Geography ==
Unlike many other rivers tracing their source on the Kenyan moor land, the Kathita River is unique as it is formed by the melting glaciers on the peaks of Mount Kenya. Hence the reason why its water is very cold at all seasons, even the piped water from this river is this distinct in this attribute of being cold. The Kathita follows a meandering course skirting through the small village towns of Kithaku, Katheri, Kaing'inyo, Gitimbene and finally cuts through the heart of the Meru Town Meru. Kathita river has got a unique attribute in that its watercourse runs through deep gorges, due to this engineering works for water irrigation projects on Kathita river is very costly.Nevertheless, local residents, through community Self Help projects, have always found ways to draw water for domestic use and irrigation Examples include the Nduruma Water Project in Kianthumbi village that was initiated by Mr Japhet MÍkiara and completed in 1997 with the financial contribution and active participation of fellow Kianthumbi residents. An extended project, the Gakumbo project that serves a larger population, was made possible with a grant from the Australian government. In the olden days the Ameru had unique log bridges which were used to cross the Kathita river along its deep gorged course. Many of those log bridges are still in operation. Some community Groups, like that at Kianthumbi village, however, have managed to upgrade them to modern standards of cement and steel structures so as to enhance safety and access across the deep gorge.

== Cultural significance ==
It is the largest river in the Imenti region of Meru County and the site of Meru people rites and rituals, including the initiation of boys into adulthood. Between 2008 and 2010, the community participated in the development of a micro-hydro generator on a portion of the river.
