= Luigi Locati =

Italian Catholic bishop (1928–2005)

- Vicar Apostolic of Isiolo
- Church: Catholic Church
- See: Apostolic Vicariate of Isiolo
- In office: 15 December 1995 – 14 July 2005
- Predecessor: Vicariate established
- Successor: Anthony Ireri Mukobo
- Other post: Titular Bishop of Zica (1995-2005)

Orders
- Ordination: 29 June 1952 by Francesco Imberti
- Consecration: 4 February 1996 by Jozef Tomko

Personal details
- Born: 23 July 1928 Vinzaglio, Province of Novara, Kingdom of Italy
- Died: 14 July 2005 (aged 76) Isiolo, Eastern Province, Kenya

Luigi Locati (23 July 1928 – 14 July 2005) was an Italian Catholic missionary and bishop. He was shot to death at the pastoral center of Isiolo, Kenya. Two priests were arrested in connection to his murder. Peter Malley Guyo Wako was convicted, while Cyril Mukuchia was released due to lack of evidence.

== Biography ==
Born in the village Vinzaglio in northern Italy, he was ordained as priest on 29 June 1952. In the 1960s he came to Kenya as a missionary and worked as a parish priest in Isiolo. On 15 December 1995, he was appointed as vicar apostolic of the newly created Vicariate Apostolic of Isiolo, Kenya, and titular bishop of Zica. In Isiolo he knew Annalena Tonelli, an Italian woman who was also a missionary and was killed in Africa in 2003.
