= Roman Catholic Diocese of Maralal =

Roman Catholic diocese in Kenya

Coordinates: 1.0912°N 36.7071°E

Diocese of Maralal Dioecesis Maralalensis

Location
- Country: Kenya
- Metropolitan: Nyeri

Statistics
- Area: 20,809 km^{2} (8,034 sq mi)
- Population: Total; Catholics: (as of 2004); 160,000; 12 (20.3%)

Information
- Rite: Latin Rite
- Cathedral: Cathedral of Sts. Peter and Paul

Current leadership
- Pope: Leo XIV
- Bishop elect: Hieronymus Emusugut Joya
- Bishops emeritus: Virgilio Pante

The Roman Catholic Diocese of Maralal (Latin: Dioecesis Maralalensis) is a diocese located in the city of Maralal in the ecclesiastical province of Nyeri in Kenya.

== History ==
- 15 June 2001: Established as Diocese of Maralal from Diocese of Marsabit

== Leadership ==
Bishops of Maralal

- Virgilio Pante, I.M.C. (15 June 2001 – 20 July 2022)
- Hieronymus Emusugut Joya (20 July 2022 – present)

== See also ==
- Roman Catholicism in Kenya

== Sources ==
- GCatholic.org
- Catholic Hierarchy
