= Peter Joseph Kairo =

Kenyan Catholic prelate

The Most Reverend Peter Joseph Kairo
- Archbishop Emeritus of Nyeri
- Church: Catholic Church
- Archdiocese: Nyeri
- See: Nyeri
- Appointed: 19 April 2008
- Installed: 14 June 2008
- Predecessor: Nicodemus Kirima
- Other post(s): Bishop of Nakuru (21 April 1997 – 19 April 2008); Bishop of Muranga (17 March 1983 – 21 April 1997)

Orders
- Ordination: 1 November 1970 by Raphael Simob Ndingi Mwana'a Nzeki
- Consecration: 21 May 1983 by Raphael Simon Ndingi Mwana'a Nzeki

Personal details
- Born: Peter Joseph Kairo; 24 May 1941 (age 84); Nakuru County, Kenya

Peter Joseph Kairo (born 24 May 1941) is a Kenyan prelate of the Catholic Church who is he Archbishop Emeritus of the Roman Catholic Archdiocese of Nyeri since his retirement in 2017. He has been a bishop since 1983, serving as ordinary in Muranga Diocese from 1983 to 1997, Nakuru Diocese from 1997 to 2008, and Archbishop of the Metropolitan Archdiocese of Nyeri from 2008 to 2017.

== Background and education ==
He was born on 24 May 1941 at Londoners, Nakuru, in Nakuru County in the Diocese of Nakuru. He is the first born in a family of nine siblings, four sons and five daughters. He studied at St. Peter's Primary School Elburgon. He then transferred to the Mother of Apostles Minor Seminary, at Moi's Bridge. He studied Philosophy and Theology in St. Thomas Aquinas Seminary, Nairobi. He graduated from St. John Fisher University (at that time "St. John Fisher College") in Rochester, New York State, in the United States with a Bachelor of Arts degree in Religious Studies.

== Priest ==
On 1 November 1970 Bishop Raphael Simon Ndingi Mwana'a Nzeki, Bishop of Machakos ordained him priest of Nakuru at Nakuru.

While priest of Nakuru, he served in several roles including as:

- Priest at Holy Rosary Parish, Nakuru Diocese
- Diocesan Education Secretary, Nakuru Diocese
- Lay Apostolate Coordinator and Vocations Director
- Spiritual Director, St. Thomas Aquinas Major Seminary, in Nairobi from 1976 until 1981
- Administrator of Christ the King Cathedral in Nakuru from January 1982 until March 1983
- Vicar General of the Diocese of Nakuru from January 1982 until March 1983.

== Bishop ==
On 17 March 1983, Pope John Paul II appointed Father Peter Joseph Kairo as the founder bishop of the newly erected Diocese of Muranga, which was peeled off from the Archdiocese of Nyeri on the same day. He was ordained and installed as Bishop of Murangá on 21 May 1983 by Bishop Raphael Simon Ndingi Mwana'a Nzeki, Bishop of Nakuru assisted by Bishop Caesar Gatimu, Bishop of Nyeri and Bishop Silas Silvius Njiru, Bishop of Meru.

On 21 April 1997, Pope John Paul II appointed him the Bishop of the Diocese of Nakuru. He took possession of the diocese in August 1997. He served in Nakuru for 11 years. On 19 April 2008, Pope Benedict XVI appointed him Archbishop of Nyeri. He was installed Archbishop of Nyeri at Ruring'u Stadium in Nyeri, on 14 June 2008.

After over 8 years of service as the Archbishop of Nyeri, his application for retirement based on his age was accepted by Pope Francis, effective 23 April 2017. He was succeeded by Bishop Anthony Muheria, formerly the Bishop of Kitui, who was appointed the new Archbishop of Nyeri, that same day. Archbishop Peter Joseph Kairo stayed on Archbishop Emeritus of Nyeri, Kenya.

== See also ==
- Catholic Church in Kenya

== Succession table ==
Catholic Church titles
Diocese created	Bishop of Muranga; 17 March 1983 – 21 April 1997	Succeeded by Peter Kihara Kariuki
Preceded by Raphael Simon Ndingi Mwana’a Nzeki	Bishop of Nakuru; 21 April 1997 - 19 April 2008	Succeeded by Cleophas Oseso Tuka
Preceded by Nicodemus Kirima	Archbishop of Nyeri; 19 April 2008 - 23 April 2017	Succeeded by Anthony Muheria
