= Diocese of Marsabit =

Diocese of Marsabit may refer to:

- One of the Anglican dioceses of Mount Kenya
- Roman Catholic Diocese of Marsabit
