= Territorial Prelature of Loreto =

Roman Catholic ecclesiastical territory in Italy

Coordinates: 43°26′25″N 13°36′26″E

Territorial Prelature of Loreto Praelatura Territorialis ab Alma Domo Lauretana

Catholic
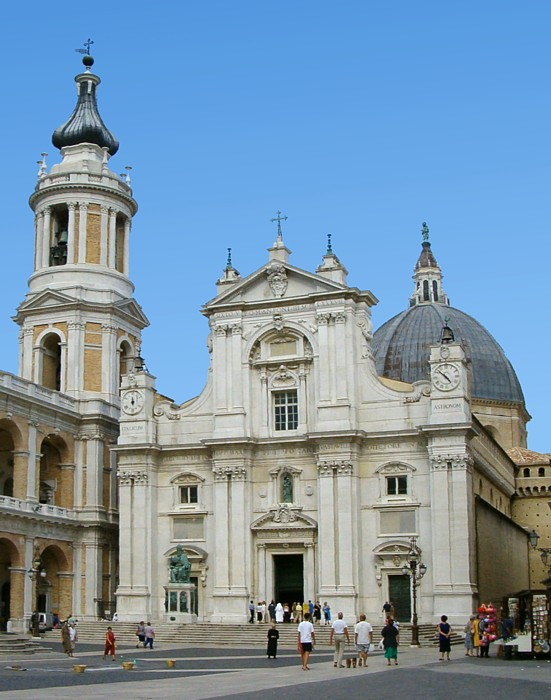
- Basilica in Loreto

Location
- Country: Italy
- Ecclesiastical province: Ancona-Osimo

Statistics
- Area: 17 km^{2} (6.6 sq mi)
- Population: Total; Catholics: (as of 2006); 11,694; 11,150 (95.3%)
- Parishes: 5

Information
- Denomination: Catholic Church
- Rite: Roman Rite
- Established: 11 October 1935 (91 years ago)
- Cathedral: Santuario Basilica Pontificia di S. Casa

Current leadership
- Pope: Leo XIV
- Prelate: Fabio Dal Cin

Map

Website
- www.santuarioloreto.it

The Territorial Prelature of Loreto (Latin: Praelatura Territorialis ab Alma Domo Lauretana) is a Latin Church territorial prelature of the Catholic Church which was elevated to this status on 24 June 1965. The Holy House of Loreto is located in it. The metropolitan see is the Archdiocese of Ancona-Osimo and the rite is Latin (or Roman). It covers 17 square kilometers (6.6 sq mi) with an address at: Piazza della Madonna 1, 60025 Loreto [Ancona], Italia. The total population is 11,537 of which 96.2% are Catholic. Serving Loreto are two secular priests, 48 religious priests for a total 50. There is approximately one priest for every 222 persons.

== History ==
Since the fifteenth century, and possibly even earlier, the "Holy House" of Loreto has been numbered among the most famous shrines of Italy. Loreto is a small town a few miles south of Ancona and near the sea. Its most conspicuous building is the basilica. This dome-crowned edifice, which with its various annexes took more than a century to build and adorn under the direction of many famous artists, serves merely as the setting of a tiny cottage standing within the basilica itself. Though the rough walls of the little building have been raised in height and are cased externally in richly sculptured marble, the interior measures only 31 feet by 13. An altar stands at one end beneath a statue, blackened with age, of the Virgin Mother and her Divine Infant. As the inscription, Hic Verbum caro factum est, reminds us, this building is honoured by Christians as the veritable cottage at Nazareth in which the Holy Family lived, and the Word became incarnate.

== Ordinaries ==
- Gaetano Malchiodi (25 January 1935 – 26 January 1960 Retired)
- Angelo Prinetto (18 October 1961 – 25 April 1965 Resigned)
- Aurelio Sabattani (24 June 1965 – 30 September 1971 Appointed Secretary of the Apostolic Signatura)
- Loris Francesco Capovilla (25 Sep 1971 – 10 December 1988 Resigned)
- Pasquale Macchi (10 December 1988 – 7 October 1996 Retired)
- Angelo Comastri (9 November 1996 – 5 February 2005 Appointed Coadjutor Archpriest of Saint Peter's Basilica)
- Gianni Danzi (22 February 2005 – 2 October 2007 Died)
- Giovanni Tonucci (18 October 2007 – 20 May 2017)
- Fabio Dal Cin (20 May 2017 – present)

== See also ==
- Territorial prelature
- Prelate
