= Filippo Perlo =

Filippo Perlo (8 February 1873 - 4 November 1948) was an Italian Catholic prelate, who was the Vicar Apostolic Emeritus of Kenya (Archdiocese of Nyeri, Kenya) and Bishop Titular of Maronea. He was also Superior General of the Consolata Missionaries (IMC).

== Vocation ==
Born in Caramagna Piemonte, Piedmont, he was ordained a priest in the Consolata Missionaries on 10 August 1895, aged 22.

On 15 July 1909, aged 36, he was appointed as Vicar Apostolic of Kenya and Bishop Titular of Maronea. On 23 October 1909, he was ordained as Bishop Titular of Maronea. He was consecrated by Agostino Cardinal Richelmy.

On 18 November 1925, aged 52, he resigned as Vicar Apostolic of Kenya.

On 16 February 1926, he was named as the Superior General of Consolata Missionaries. On 11 January 1929, almost 56 years old, he resigned.

== Death ==
On 4 November 1948, aged 75, Bishop Perlo died, holding the title of Vicar Apostolic Emeritus of Kenya.

He had been a priest for 53 years and a bishop for 39 years.
