= Grace Lolim =

Kenyan human rights and peace activist

- Occupations: Human rights and peace activist
- Known for: Founded Isiolo Gender Watch

Grace Lolim is a Kenyan human rights and peace activist, the former chair of the Isiolo Peace Committee, current chair of indigenous women council that brings together women from pastoralist, hunters/gatherers and fisher forks from 23 counties in Kenya, and the founder and executive director of Isiolo Gender Watch.

== Early life ==
Lolim is from Isiolo, and was brought up in the Turkana community.

== Career and activism ==
Lolim started advocating for peace in 2000 when Somalis and Boranas were fighting in Isiolo. Although she had successfully fled the conflict with her husband and children, she returned there to help her parents and the siblings she left behind. She discovered her family members hiding with other villagers along the riverbank, exposed to attacks by crocodiles.

Despite persuasion from her husband, Lolim refused to leave her relatives in distress. She embarked on a journey of dialogue to end the conflict by joining the village peace committee. She was appointed by other women to speak during a conflict mitigation meeting at the locational level, a position that saw her interact with committee members from other tribes.

She was the only woman to be nominated to speak for the village.

In 2002, the United Nations Development Programme nominated Lolim to take part in an exchange program with Rwandan women to learn about the impact of armed conflict. According to one account, she preached peace using teachings she found in both the Bible and Koran, which was helpful in reaching her diverse audiences and was a great milestone for the peace committee.

In 2013, Lolim founded Isiolo Gender Watch, an organization that advocates for human rights and gender equality, where (as of 2022) she works as the executive director. Lolim is the chair of the Isiolo Peace Committee

During the COVID-19 pandemic, Lolim lead efforts to share health messaging to her local community. In 2020, she advocated for more women to be included in peacebuilding efforts. In 2022, she spoke about the prevalence of sexual and gender based violence, and the need for justice in response to the murder of peace activist Elizabeth Ibrahim.

== See also ==
- List of peace activists
