= Roman Catholic Diocese of Embu =

Roman Catholic diocese in Kenya

Coordinates: 0.5329°S 37.4778°E

Diocese of Embu Dioecesis Embuensis

Location
- Country: Kenya
- Metropolitan: Nyeri

Statistics
- Area: 2,714 km^{2} (1,048 sq mi)
- Population: Total; Catholics: (as of 2004); 542,000; 328,000 (60.5%)

Information
- Rite: Latin Rite
- Cathedral: Sts. Peter and Paul Cathedral

Current leadership
- Pope: Leo XIV
- Bishop: Peter Kimani Ndung'u

The Roman Catholic Diocese of Embu (Latin: Dioecesis Embuensis) is a diocese located in the city of Embu in the ecclesiastical province of Nyeri in Kenya.

== History ==
- June 9, 1986: Established as Diocese of Embu from the Diocese of Meru

== Leadership ==
- Bishops of Embu (Roman rite)
  - Bishop John Njue (9 Jun 1986 – 9 Mar 2002), appointed Coadjutor Bishop of Nyeri; future Cardinal
  - Bishop Anthony Muheria (30 October 2003 to 2008), appointed Bishop of Kitui
  - Bishop Paul Kariuki Njiru (2009 to 22 July 2023), appointed Bishop of Wote
  - Bishop Peter Kimani Ndung'u (Since 16 November 2024)

== See also ==
- Roman Catholicism in Kenya

== Sources ==
- GCatholic.org
- Catholic Hierarchy
