= Nicodemus Kirima =

Kenyan Catholic prelate (1936–2007)

The Most Reverend Nicodemus Kirima
- Archbishop Archbishop of Nyeri, Kenya
- Church: Roman Catholic Church
- Archdiocese: Roman Catholic Archdiocese of Nyeri
- Metropolis: Roman Catholic Archdiocese of Nyeri
- See: Nyeri
- Appointed: 21 May 1990
- Installed: 21 May 1990
- Term ended: 27 November 2007
- Predecessor: Caesar Gatimu
- Successor: Peter Joseph Kairo
- Previous posts: Bishop of Mombasa (14 May 1978 - 12 March 1988); Bishop of Nyeri (12 March 1988 – 21 May 1990)

Orders
- Ordination: 22 December 1962
- Consecration: 14 May 1978 by Cardinal Maurice Michael Otunga

Personal details
- Born: Nicodemus Kirima; 3 March 1936 Karatina, Nyeri County, Kenya
- Died: 27 November 2007 (aged 71) Nairobi Hospital in Nairobi, Kenya

Ordination history of Nicodemus Kirima
History
Priestly ordination
- Date: 22 December 1962

Nicodemus Kirima (3 March 1936 - 27 November 2007) was a Roman Catholic prelate who served as Archbishop of the Roman Catholic Archdiocese of Nyeri from 1990 until his death in 2007. Previously, he served as the Bishop of the Catholic Diocese of Nyeri from 1988 until 1990. Before that, he was the Bishop of the Roman Catholic Diocese of Mombasa from 1978 until 1988. He was appointed bishop on 27 February 1978 by Pope Paul VI. He died in office on 27 November 2007, at the age of 71 years, as Archbishop of Nyeri, Kenya.

== Early life and education ==
Nicodemus Kirima was born on 3 March 1936 in Karatina, Nyeri District, Nyeri County, Kenya. He studied philosophy and theology before he was ordained priest in December 1962.

== Priest ==
He was ordained a priest of the Catholic Diocese of Nyeri on 22 December 1962. He served in that capacity until 27 February 1978.

== Bishop ==
The Holy Father Paul VI appointed him as the Bishop of Mombasa Catholic Diocese, on 27 February 1978. He served in that capacity until 12 March 1988.

He was consecrated and installed at Mombasa on 14 May 1978 by the hands of Cardinal Maurice Michael Otunga, Archbishop of Nairobi assisted by Archbishop Agostino Cacciavillan, Titular Archbishop of Amiternum and Bishop John Njenga, Bishop of Eldoret.

On 12 March 1988, Pope John Paul II appointed him Bishop of the diocese of Nyeri, to succeed the late Bishop Caesar Gatimu. On 21 May 1990, The Holy Father elevated the Diocese of Nyeri to the Roman Catholic Archdiocese of Nyeri. Bishop Nicodemus Kirima was selected as the first archbishop of the new "Metropolitan See".

== Illness and death ==
In 2002, Archbishop Kirima underwent a kidney transplant, when his brother donated one of his kidneys to him. In 2006, while on a trip to the United States, he developed kidney failure. His health continued to deteriorate over the next one year.

On 4 November 2007, while receiving kidney dialysis at Consolata Mission Hospital Mathari, he went into a coma. He was airlifted to Nairobi Hospital for further treatment and management. He died there on 27 November 2007. He was 71 years old.

== See also ==
- Catholic Church in Kenya

== Succession table ==
Catholic Church titles
Preceded by Eugene Joseph Butler (26 January 1957 - 27 February 1978)	Bishop of Mombasa (27 February 1978 - 12 March 1988	Succeeded by John Joseph Njenga
Preceded by Caesar Gatimu (25 November 1964 - 20 February 1987)	Bishop of Nyeri; 12 March 1988 – 21 May 1990	Succeeded by None (Diocese elevated)
Preceded by None (Archdiocese created)	Archbishop of Nyeri; 21 May 1990 – 27 November 2007	Succeeded by Peter Joseph Kairo
