= Anthony Muheria =

Kenyan Roman Catholic prelate

His Excellency, The Most Reverend Anthony Muheria
- Archbishop
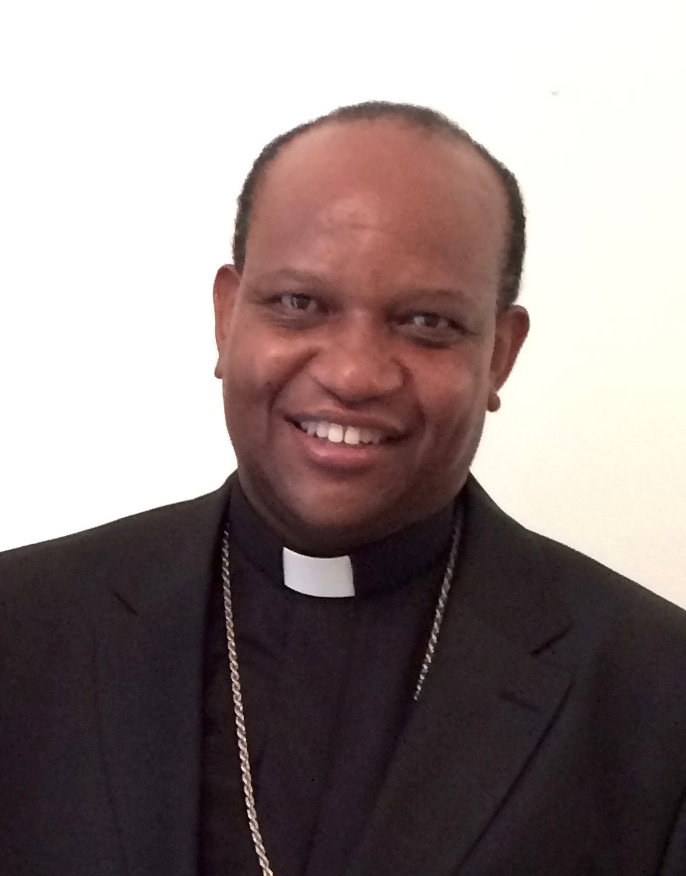
- Church: Catholic Church
- Archdiocese: Nyeri
- Appointed: 30 October 2003
- Predecessor: Peter Joseph Kairo
- Successor: Incumbent
- Other post(s): • Bishop of the Roman Catholic Diocese of Embu - (10 Jan 2004 - • Bishop of the Roman Catholic Diocese of Kitui - (9 Aug 2008 - • Apostolic Administrator of the Roman Catholic Diocese of Embu - (28 June 2008 - 25 July 2009) • Apostolic Administrator of the Roman Catholic Diocese of Machakos - (21 Feb 2015 - 25 Aug 2018) • Apostolic Administrator of the Roman Catholic Diocese of Kitui - (23 April 2017 - 29 Aug 2020) • Archbishop of the Roman Catholic Archdiocese of Nyeri - (17 June 2017 - Incumbent)

Orders
- Ordination: 13 June 1993 by Bishop Álvaro del Portillo
- Consecration: 10 January 2004 by Giovanni Tonucci
- Rank: Archbishop

Personal details
- Born: Anthony Muheria; 27 May 1963 (age 61); Kaburugi Parish Muranga County, Kenya
- Motto: UT ESSEMUS SANCTI ('SO THAT WE MAY BE HOLY')
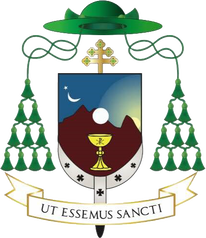
- Coat of arms

Styles of Anthony Muheria
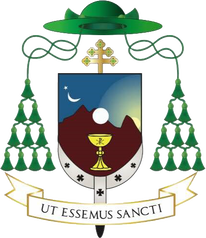
- Reference style: His Excellency; The Most Reverend
- Spoken style: Your Excellency
- Religious style: Archbishop

Ordination history of Anthony Muheria
History
Diaconal ordination
- Ordained by: Bishop Álvaro del Portillo as an Opus Dei Deacon
- Date: 31 January 1993
- Place: Sant'Eugenio, Diocese of Rome
Priestly ordination
- Ordained by: Bishop Álvaro del Portillo as an Opus Dei Priest
- Date: 13 June 1993
- Place: Sant'Eugenio, Diocese of Rome
Episcopal consecration
- Principal consecrator: Archbishop Giovanni Tonucci
- Co-consecrators: Archbishop John Njue (then Coadjutor Bishop of the Roman Catholic Archdiocese of Nyeri - later Cardinal (Catholic Church)) and Archbishop Raphael S. Ndingi Mwana a'Nzeki (then Archbishop of the Roman Catholic Archdiocese of Nairobi
- Date: 10 January 2004
- Place: Grounds of, Don Bosco Boys Technical School, Embu (Roman Catholic Diocese of Embu)

Anthony Muheria (born 27 May 1963) is a Kenyan Catholic bishop who serves as Archbishop of the Archdiocese of Nyeri. He was appointed Archbishop of Nyeri on 23 April 2017.

== Background and priesthood ==
Anthony Muheria was born on 27 May 1963, in Kaburugi Parish, in the Diocese of Muranga, in present-day Muranga County. Between 1979 and 1980 He attended Strathmore College in Nairobi for his form five and six studies. After high school, he studied at the University of Nairobi, graduating in 1984, with a Bachelor of Science degree in Civil Engineering. He worked as a civil engineer for five years and then joined Opus Dei. He was sent to study at the Pontifical University of the Holy Cross in Rome, where he graduated with a degree in Theology in 1993. He was ordained a priest on 13 June 1993. He served as a Priest of Opus Dei, until 30 October 2003.

== As bishop ==
Father Muheria was appointed Bishop of Embu on 30 October 2003 and received episcopal consecration at Embu on 10 January 2004 at the hands of Archbishop Giovanni Tonucci, Titular Archbishop of Torcello, assisted by Archbishop John Njue, Coadjutor Archbishop of Nyeri and Archbishop Raphael Simon Ndingi Mwana'a Nzeki, of Nairobi.

Bishop Muheria was appointed Bishop of Kitui and apostolic administrator of Embu Diocese on 28 June 2008, his mandate as administrator of Embu ceasing on 25 July 2009.

On 21 February 2015, he was appointed apostolic administrator of the Diocese of Machakos. That apostolic administration ceased on 25 August 2018.

On 23 April 2017, Bishop Anthony Muheria was appointed Archbishop of Nyeri. On the same day, he was appointed apostolic administrator of Kitui Diocese. That apostolic administration ceased on 29 August 2020.

On 17 June 2017, he was installed as Archbishop of Nyeri, succeeding Archbishop Peter Joseph Kairo, who retired upon reaching the mandatory retirement age of 75 years.

During the Kenya political turmoil in June/July 2024, he advocated for the appointment and parliamentary vetting of cabinet secretaries with "integrity" to minimize "political wheeler dealing".

== See also ==
- Peter Kimani Ndung'u
- Catholic Church in Kenya

== Succession table ==
Catholic Church titles
Peter Joseph Kairo (19 April 2008 - 23 April 2017)	Archbishop of Nyeri (17 June 2017 – present)	Succeeded by Incumbent
Preceded by Boniface Lele (2 November 1995 - 1 April 2005)	Bishop of Kitui (28 June 2008 - 23 April 2017)	Succeeded by Joseph Maluki Mwongela (17 March 2020 - present)
John Njue (9 June 1986 - 9 March 2002)	Bishop of Embu (30 October 2003 - 28 June 2008)	Succeeded by Paul Kariuki Njiru (9 May 2009 - 22 July 2023)
