= Diocese of Murang'a =

Roman Catholic diocese in Kenya

Diocese of Muranga Dioecesis Murangaensis

Location
- Country: Kenya
- Metropolitan: Nyeri

Statistics
- Area: 4,016 km^{2} (1,551 sq mi)
- Population: Total; Catholics: (as of 2004); 1,441,116; 695,830 (48.3%)

Information
- Rite: Latin Rite
- Cathedral: Cathedral of the Sacred Heart of Jesus

Current leadership
- Pope: Leo XIV
- Bishop: James Maria Wainaina Kungu

The Roman Catholic Diocese of Murang'a (Latin: Dioecesis Murangaënsis) is a diocese located in the city of Murang'a in the ecclesiastical province of Nyeri in Kenya.

== History ==
- March 17, 1983: Established as Diocese of Murang’a from Diocese of Nyeri

== Leadership ==
- Bishops of Murang'a (Roman rite)
  - Bishop Peter Joseph Kairo (17 Mar 1983 – 21 Apr 1997), appointed Bishop of Nakuru
  - Bishop Peter Kihara Kariuki, I.M.C. (3 Jun 1999 – 25 Nov 2006), appointed Bishop of Marsabit
  - Archbishop John Njue (Apostolic Administrator starting 2006.11) (Cardinal in 2007)
  - Bishop James Maria Wainaina Kungu (since 27 June 2009)

== See also ==
- Roman Catholicism in Kenya

== Sources ==
- GCatholic.org
- Catholic Hierarchy
