= Fabio Dal Cin =

Italian prelate

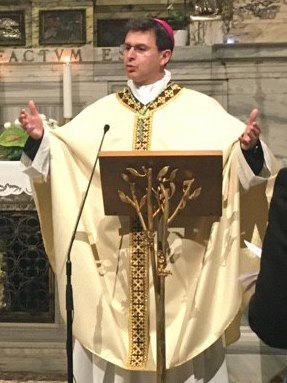
Dal Cin in 2019

Fabio Dal Cin (born 23 January 1965) is an Italian prelate of the Catholic Church who has served as the archbishop prelate of Loreto and papal delegate for the Basilica of Loreto and for the Basilica of St. Anthony in Padua since May 2017. He spent the previous ten years as personal secretary to Cardinal Marc Ouellet, prefect of the Congregation for Bishops.

== Biography ==
Fabio Dal Cin was born in Sarmede in Italy's Veneto region on 23 January 1965. He attended the diocesan seminaries and was ordained a priest for the diocese of Vittorio Veneto on 7 December 1990.

In 1990, he was appointed parish vicar of Motta di Livenza, site of a pilgrimage shrine, the Basilica of the Madonna dei Miracoli. In 1988, he became an animator of the youth community of the minor seminary and deputy director of the diocesan vocation centre. He earned a licentiate in sacred theology from the Santa Giustina Institute of Pastoral Liturgy in Padua, with a speciality in liturgical-pastoral affairs.

In 2000, he was named episcopal delegate for vocational pastoral ministry and director of the diocesan vocation centre. In 2001, he became professor of liturgy at the Studio Teologico Interdiocesano Treviso–Vittorio Veneto. In 2003, he became master of ceremonies at the major seminary. In 2004, he was appointed a member of the commission for permanent deacons.

In March 2007, he took up a position in the Congregation for Bishops as personal secretary to its prefect, Cardinal Marc Ouellet. While working there, he obtained a doctorate in theology from the Pontifical Athenaeum of Saint Anselm in 2011. He also engaged in pastoral work at Rome's church of Santa Maria della Quercia.

On 20 May 2017, Pope Francis named him archbishop prelate of Loreto and papal delegate for the shrine of Loreto and for the Basilica of St. Anthony in Padua. He later said he was surprised and had already asked for an assignment in his home diocese. He received his episcopal consecration in Vittorio Veneto on 9 July from Ouellet and was installed in Loreto on 2 September and visited Padua as papal delegate for the first time on 22 October.
