= Angelo Comastri =

Italian prelate (born 1943)

His Eminence Angelo Comastri
- Archpriest Emeritus of Saint Peter's Basilica
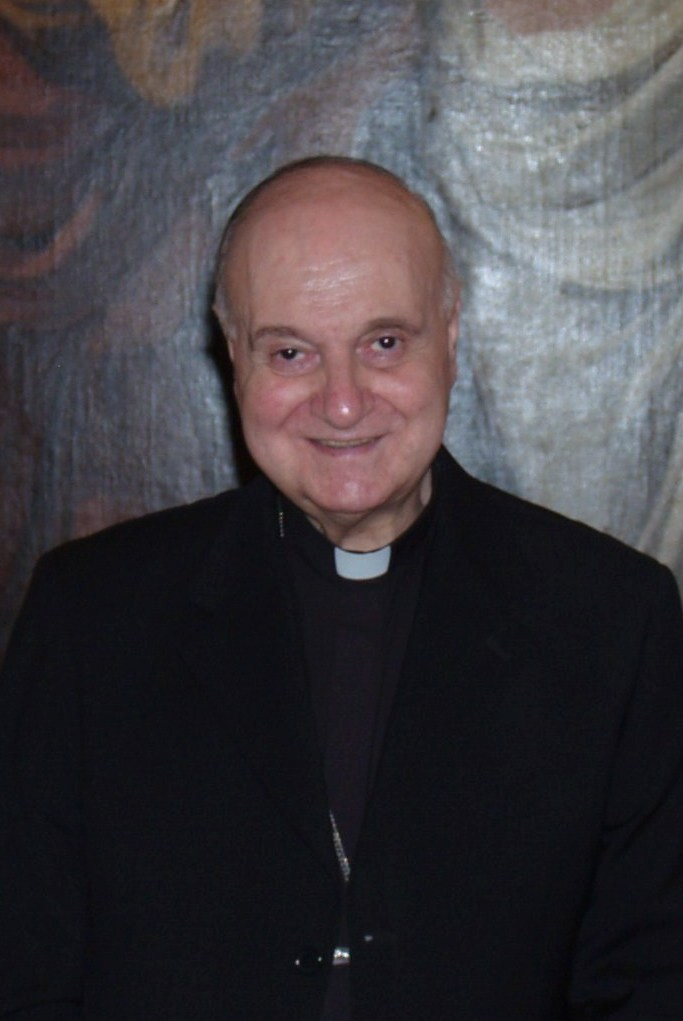
- Church: Catholic Church
- Appointed: 31 October 2006
- Term ended: 20 February 2021
- Predecessor: Francesco Marchisano
- Successor: Mauro Gambetti, O.F.M. Conv.
- Other post: Cardinal-Priest of San Salvatore in Lauro (2007–)
- Previous posts: Bishop of Massa Marittima-Piombino (1990–1994); Archbishop-Prelate of Loreto (1996–2005); Coadjutor Archpriest of Saint Peter's Basilica (2005–2006); Archpriest of St. Peter's Basilica (2005–2021); Vicar General for the Vatican City State (2005–21); President of the Fabric of Saint Peter (2005–21)

Orders
- Ordination: 11 March 1967 by Luigi Boccadoro
- Consecration: 12 September 1990 by Bernardin Gantin
- Created cardinal: 24 November 2007 by Pope Benedict XVI
- Rank: Cardinal-Deacon (2007–18); Cardinal-Priest (from 2018)

Personal details
- Born: 17 September 1943 (age 82) Sorano, Tuscany, Italy
- Denomination: Catholic
- Motto: Deus Charitas Est
- Coat of arms

Angelo Comastri (born 17 September 1943) is an Italian prelate of the Catholic Church. He was Archpriest of St. Peter's Basilica from 2006 to 2021, and Vicar General for the Vatican City State and President of the Fabric of Saint Peter from 2005 to 2021. He previously served as Bishop of Massa Marittima-Piombino (1990–1994) and Territorial Prelate of Loreto (1996–2005). He was named a cardinal in 2007.

== Biography ==
Comastri was born in Sorano, in the province of Grosseto to Fernando and Beneria (née Scossa) Comastri. He received his early education at schools in his native town and attended the seminary of Pitigliano and the Regional Seminary S. Maria della Quercia in Viterbo. He continued his studies at the Pontifical Lateran University where he earned a Licentiate of Sacred Theology and at the Pontifical Roman Seminary. On 11 March 1967, he was ordained to the priesthood by Bishop Luigi Boccadoro.

Comastri served as vice-rector of the minor seminary of Pitigliano and, at the same time, did pastoral work in the parish of San Quirico'. He was later assigned to the Roman Curia as an official of the Congregation for Bishops. He served as spiritual director of the Pontifical Minor Roman Seminary and a chaplain at Roman jails before returning to Pitigliano, where he became rector of the seminary in 1971. In 1979, he was named pastor of the parish of San Stefano Protomartire in Porto Santo Stefano. He was also a member of the diocesan college of consultors, and served as episcopal delegate for the seminarians residing outside of the diocese and professor of religion at the Professional Institute for Maritime Activities in Porto Santo Stefano.

On 25 July 1990, Comastri was appointed Bishop of Massa Marittima-Piombino by Pope John Paul II. He received his episcopal consecration on 12 September from Cardinal Bernardin Gantin, with Archbishop Gaetano Bonicelli and Bishop Eugenio Binini serving as co-consecrators, in the parish church San Stefano Protomartire. He resigned as bishop for health reasons on 3 March 1994. Following his recovery, he was named president of the National Italian Committee for the Jubilee of the Year 2000 and placed in charge of the National Center for Vocations of the Italian Episcopal Conference.

Comastri was named Territorial Prelate of the Territorial Prelature of Loreto, with the personal title of archbishop, on 9 November 1996. On 5 February 2005, he was appointed President of the Fabric of Saint Peter, Vicar General of His Holiness for the State of Vatican City, and Coadjutor Archpriest of St. Peter's Basilica. He preached the Lenten spiritual exercises for Pope John Paul II and the Roman Curia in 2003 and the meditations for the Stations of the Cross in the Colosseum on Good Friday 2006. Upon the retirement of Cardinal Francesco Marchisano on 31 October 2006, Comastri succeeded him as Archpriest of St. Peter's Basilica.

Pope Benedict XVI created him a cardinal in the consistory of 24 November 2007, assigning him the titular church of San Salvatore in Lauro with the rank of cardinal-deacon. In addition to his main duties, he also serves as vice-president of the Pontifical Academy of the Immacolata and he has been a member of the Congregation for the Causes of Saints since 2005.

Comastri participated in the papal conclave that elected Pope Francis. After ten years as a cardinal-deacon, he was raised to the rank of cardinal-priest on 19 May 2018.

In a 2020 television interview, Comastri objected to Turkey's decision to turn Hagia Sophia, once a church and long a museum, into a mosque. He said:

No mosque was ever turned into a Catholic Church, and no Catholic has ever shot at an imam. They’ve even shot the pope himself, on May 13, 1981, in St. Peter’s Square: If they want dialogue, it must be done with fair and honest weapons, with the honesty of looking into each other’s eyes and answering with facts.

Comastri said COVID-19 "does not come from God" and that powerful states are "organizing world wars, including bacteriological wars"; he said it was possible that Chinese government research was the source of COVID-19, a charge China has denied.

Pope Francis accepted Comastri's resignation as vicar general, archpriest, and president of the Fabric on 20 February 2021.

Catholic Church titles
Preceded by Francesco Marchisano	President of the Fabric of Saint Peter; 5 February 2005 – 20 February 2021	Succeeded by Mauro Gambetti
Preceded by Francesco Marchisano	Vicar General of His Holiness for the State of Vatican City; 5 February 2005 – 20 February 2021	Succeeded by Mauro Gambetti
Preceded by Francesco Marchisano	Archpriest of St. Peter's Basilica; 31 October 2006 – 20 February 2021	Succeeded by Mauro Gambetti
