= Caesar Gatimu =

Kenyan Roman Catholic prelate (1921-1987)

The Most Reverend Caesar Gatimu
- Bishop of Nyeri, Kenya
- Church: Catholic Church
- Archdiocese: Roman Catholic Archdiocese of Nairobi
- See: Nyeri
- Appointed: 18 April 1961
- Installed: 21 May 1961
- Predecessor: Charles (Carlo) Maria Cavallera
- Successor: Nicodemus Kirima
- Other post: Auxiliary Bishop of Nyeri (18 April 1961 - 25 November 1964)

Orders
- Ordination: 17 March 1947
- Consecration: 21 May 1961 by Pope John XXIII

Personal details
- Born: Caesar Gatimu; May 18, 1921 Limuru, Kiambu County, Kenya
- Died: 20 February 1987 (aged 65) Nyeri, Nyeri County, Kenya

The Right Reverend Caesar Gatimu (18 May 1921 – 20 February 1987) was a Roman Catholic prelate in Kenya, who served as Bishop of the Diocese of Nyeri from 1964 until his retirement in 1987. He previously served as Auxiliary Bishop of Nyeri from 1961 until 1964. He was appointed bishop on 18 April 1961 by Pope John XXIII. He died on 20 February 1987 at the age of 65 years, as Bishop of Nyeri.

== Early life and education ==
He was born on 18 May 1921 at Limuru, Kiambu County, Kenya. He studied at the St. Augustine's Minor Seminary in Nyeri. He studied both philosophy and theology at the Pontifical Urban University, starting in 1939. Later in 1948 he graduated with a Doctor of Divinity from there.

== Priest ==
On 17 March 1947, Gatimu was ordained as a priest of the Archdiocese of Nyeri, Kenya. He served in that capacity until 18 April 1961.

As priest, he worked in the diocese of Nyeri in various pastoral roles including as:

- Parish priest of Kianyaga Catholic Mission between 1956 until 1959
- Counselor in Nyeri Diocese since 1959.

== Bishop ==
On 18 April 1961, he was appointed as Auxiliary Bishop of Nyeri and concurrently as Titular Bishop of Abila in Palaestina. He was consecrated on 21 May 1961 in Rome, together with thirteen other bishops from "missionary countries". The Principal Consecrator was Pope John XXIII, assisted by Bishop Fulton John Sheen, Titular Bishop of Caesariana and Bishop Edoardo Mason, Titular Bishop of Rusicade.

On 25 November 1964, he was appointed Bishop of Nyeri when Bishop Cavallera was transferred to the new diocese of Marsabit. He was the first Kikuyu Catholic bishop and efficiently contributed to the development of the Catholic Church in his diocese and country. He died in office on 20 February 1987 as Bishop of Nyeri, Kenya.

== Legacy ==
He is credited with establishing Bishop Gatimu Ngandu Girls High School in Nyeri Archdiocese. He is reported to have attended the Second Vatican Council: Session One and the Second Vatican Council: Session Four.

== See also ==
- Catholic Church in Kenya

== Succession table ==
Catholic Church titles
Preceded by	Auxiliary Bishop of Nyeri (18 Apr 1961 - 25 November 1964)	Succeeded by
Preceded by Charles (Carlo) Maria Cavallera, I.M.C. (19 June 1947 - 25 November 1964)	Bishop of Nyeri (25 November 1964 - 20 February 1987)	Succeeded by Nicodemus Kirima
