= Isiolo =

District capital in Kenya

- Town
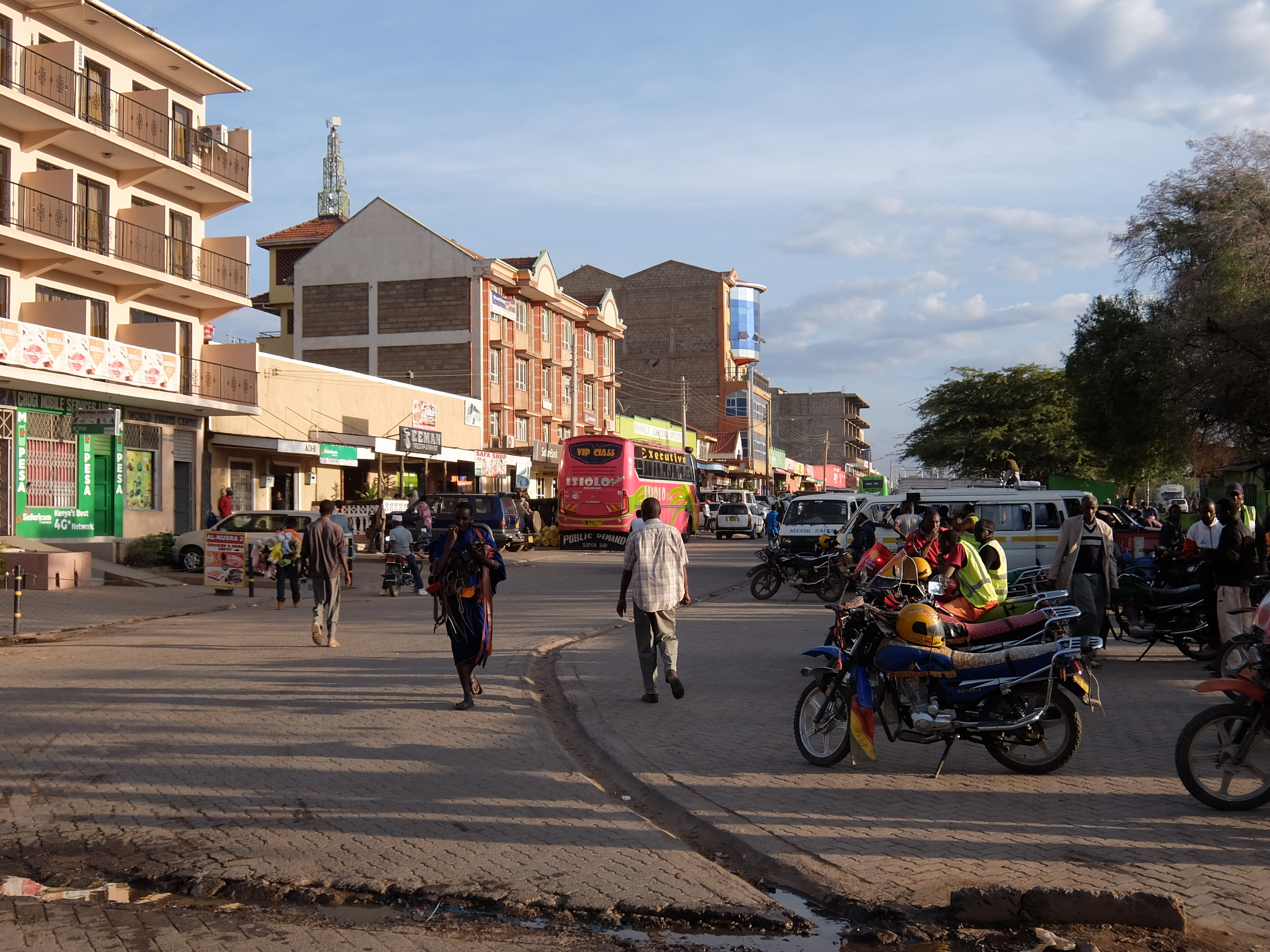
- View of the main street in Isiolo Town

- Location within Kenya Location within the Horn of Africa Location within Africa
- Coordinates: 00°21′N 37°35′E
- Country: Kenya
- County: Isiolo County

Population
  - Total: 98,000 (no reliable sources found)
- Time zone: UTC+3 (EAT)
- Website: https://isiolo.go.ke/

Isiolo is the capital of Kenya's Isiolo County. It is located near the country's geographical centre, 285 km (177 mi) north of Nairobi. The town grew around the local military camps. Much of the population consists of Somali, Borana, and Ameru as well as minority groups including Turkana and Samburu. The town has an estimated population of 78,250, most of whom live on the outskirts of the town. There has been a steady increase in the urban population, especially from Moyale, Marsabit and Mandera. Isiolo is adjacent to Samburu and Shaba Game reserves. Isiolo lies along the long A2 Road, leading towards Marsabit and Moyale much further north.

== Overview ==
Isiolo is set to become a major part of Kenya's economic development plan Vision 2030. The plan calls for Isiolo to become a tourist centre that will include casinos, hotels, upscale retail outlets, a modern airport and transport facilities. Isiolo will also be a transport hub as the location of the fork of the LAPSSET.

Isiolo District was designated as the Headquarters of the Northern frontier Districts while it was under the British East Africa Protectorate in 1922, until the North Eastern was carved out as a separate province in 1963 when Kenya gained its independence.

Isiolo is known for its large market, featuring brass, copper and aluminium jewellery making is a local industry. Isiolo is a transport hub to the northern border town of Moyale. Trucks to and from Moyale make stop-overs boosting the hotel business in the town centre. Isiolo has been the headquarters of N.F.D.(Northern Frontier Districts) since the issue of the District Ordinance act 1937 & NFD commission 1962. Isiolo is the headquarters of the District because there was no urban centre to serve as district headquarters. The Samburu, Buffalo Springs and Shaba National Reserve lie north of the town, while Lewa Downs Reserve in Meru County is located south of Isiolo.

Since 1995, the town has been the seat of the Vicariate Apostolic of Isiolo. On 14 July 2005, Bishop Luigi Locati, who represented the Roman Catholic Church in Isiolo, was murdered. The High Court sent Father Guyo Waqo Malley and four others — Mohamed Molu, Aden Ibrahim Mohammed, Mahati Ali Halake and Roba Balla Bariche — to the gallows for planning and murdering Bishop Luigi Locati.

The town of Isiolo is small but cosmopolitan. home to the Ameru, Samburu, Turkana, Rendille, Boran, Somali. Additionally, there are some Indian shopkeepers.

The town is religiously diverse with a near-equal Christian and Muslim population. The Jamia mosque and the Catholic church's twin bell towers are among the landmarks.

The town has hot climate and has avenues of trees in town to provide shade. During the June to August period, the town experiences strong dry winds and is generally very dusty.

Daisy Waugh's book A Small Town in Africa (1994) is about the six months Waugh spent living in Isiolo.

American actress Drew Barrymore opened The Barrymore Learning Academy, a school in Isiolo, in 2004.

== Notable people ==
Grace Lolim is a human rights and peace activist, the chair of the Isiolo Peace Committee.

== Transport ==
The trans-African automobile route, the Cairo-Cape Town Highway, passes through Isiolo. The Kenyan section of this road from Nairobi to the Ethiopian border is designated A2.

The town is served by Isiolo Airport, which has been upgraded to an international airport to serve tourism and local exports.

== Capital Change ==
George Wajackoyah in his manifesto mentioned that he would change the national capital of Kenya to Isiolo.

== See also ==
- Isiolo massacre
