= Giovanni Tonucci =

Italian archbishop

Coat of arms of Giovanni Tonucci.

Giovanni Tonucci (born 4 December 1941 in Fano, PU, Italy) is an Italian archbishop of the Catholic Church. He worked in the diplomatic service of the Holy See from 1971 until his retirement in 2017.

== Diplomatic career ==
From 1971 till the end of 1973 his diplomatic career took him to Yaoundé, Cameroon, then, from 1974 to 1976 to the United Kingdom. From July 1976 he was back in Rome, assigned to the Section for General Affairs of the Holy See Secretariat of State where he worked with Agostino Casaroli, until being transferred, in April 1978, to the Section for the Relations with States under Achille Silvestrini. At the end of the 1984 he was assigned to the Apostolic Nunciature in Belgrade, at that time still the Yugoslavia, where he worked until the summer of 1987 when he was transferred to the Nunicature to the United States in Washington.

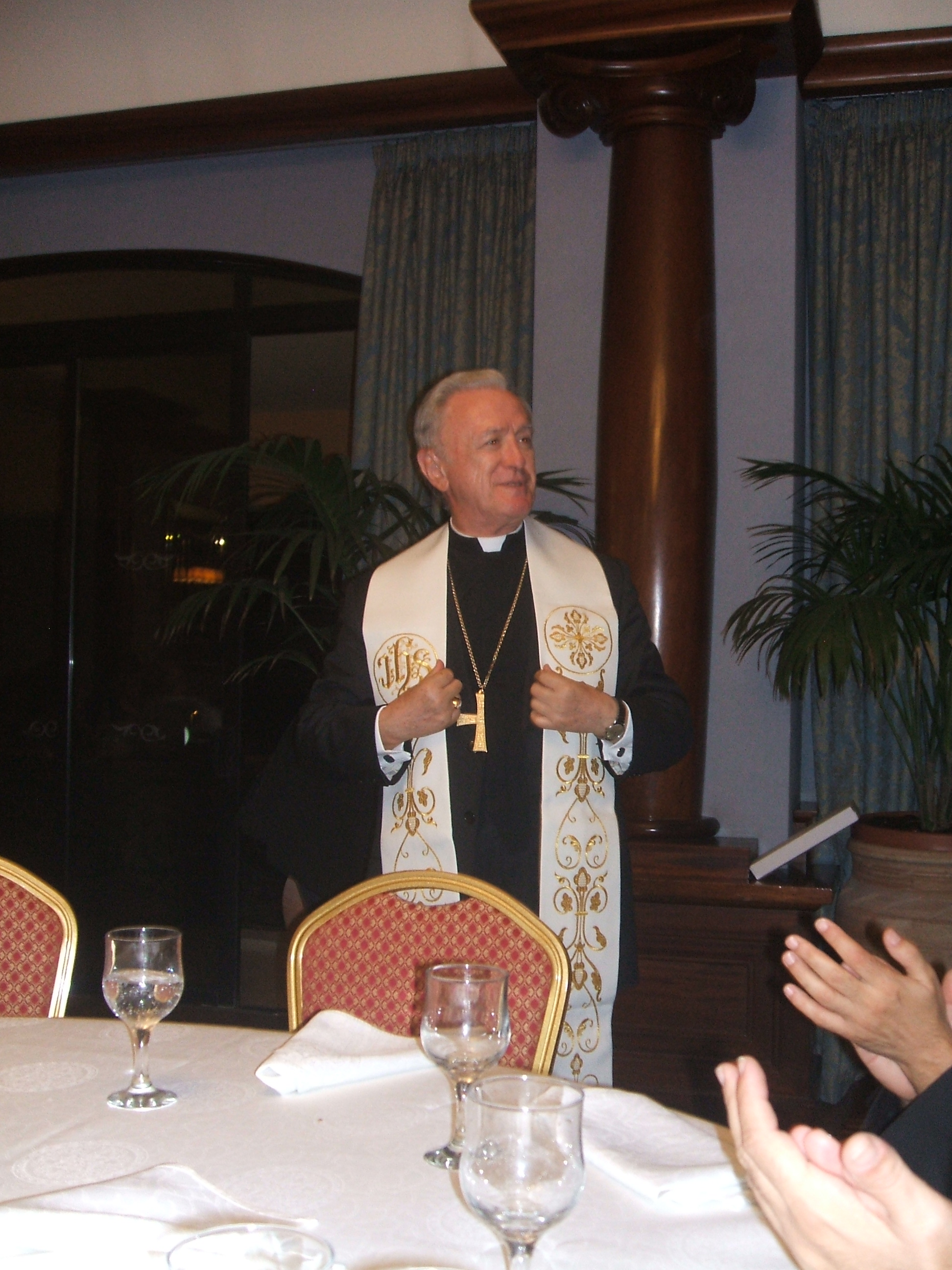
Archbishop Giovanni Tonucci in 2014

On 21 October 1989 Tonucci was appointed Titular Archbishop of Torcello and Apostolic Nuncio to Bolivia.

He was consecrated a bishop on 6 January 1990 by Pope John Paul II, with co-consecrators Msgr. Giovanni Battista Re and Msgr. Miroslav Stefan Marusyn.

On 9 March 1996 he was named the Apostolic Nuncio to Kenya.

The role of Permanent Observer Permanent Observer of the Holy See to the UN Environment and Human Settlements Programs (UNEP/UN–HABITAT) was added the next year.

On 16 October 2004, Pope John Paul II appointed him Apostolic Nuncio to Sweden, Denmark, Finland, Iceland and Norway.

== Later offices ==
On 18 October 2007 Pope Benedict XVI appointed him Prelate of Territorial Prelature of Loreto and Pontifical Delegate for the Shrine of the Holy House of Loreto. Pope Francis named him Pontifical Delegate for the Basilica of Saint Anthony in Padua on 8 March 2014, and accepted his resignation from both these positions on 20 May 2017.

== Family ==
His brother Paolo Maria Tonucci was a missionary in Brazil from 1965 to 1994. He conducted a battle for the rights of the poor people against the military dictatorship, which led to his being characterized as "unworthy" of Brazilian citizenship.

== Works ==
- Giovanni Tonucci, "God's letter to me – 101 questions and answers on the Bible".
- Giovanni Tonucci, Roberto Ansuini; "Don Paolo". Text by Paolo Tonucci [and oth.], Fondazione Cassa di Risparmio di Fano, Grapho 5, 2004.
- Giovanni Tonucci, "Visioni di un pellegrino. Le foto di Mzee Mwenda". Edited in Italian and English, Velar, 2006. ISBN 88-7135-233-5.
- Giovanni Tonucci, Massimo Ciavaglia, "El Vangel cum l'ha scrit San Marc". (dialect of Fano), Ven. Confraternitas Sanctae Mariae Suffragii, Fano, 2007.

== See also ==
- Diplomatic missions of the Holy See
- Diplomacy of the Holy See
- John Anthony Kaiser

Preceded by	Alternate Permanent Observer to the OAS; 1987 – 21 October 1989	Succeeded by
Preceded by Gino Paro	Titular Archbishop of Torcello; 21 October 1989 – 18 October 2007	Succeeded by Gianfranco Gardin
Preceded by Santos Abril y Castelló	Apostolic Nuncio to Bolivia; 21 October 1989 – 9 March 1996	Succeeded by Giacomo Guido Ottonello
Preceded by Clemente Faccani	Apostolic Nuncio to Kenya; 9 March 1996 – 16 October 2004	Succeeded by Alain Paul Charles Lebeaupin
Preceded by None	Permanent Observer to UNEP/UN-HABITAT; 1997 – 16 October 2004	Succeeded by Alain Paul Charles Lebeaupin
Preceded by Piero Biggio	Apostolic Nuncio to Sweden, Denmark, Finland, Iceland, Norway; 16 October 2004 – 18 October 2007	Succeeded by Emil Paul Tscherrig
Preceded by Gianni Danzi	Prelate of the Territorial Prelature of Loreto; 18 October 2007 – 20 May 2017	Succeeded by Fabio Dal Cin
