= Diocese of Meru =

Roman Catholic diocese in Kenya

Coordinates: 0.0522°N 37.6483°E

Diocese of Meru Dioecesis Meruensis

Location
- Country: Kenya
- Metropolitan: Nyeri

Statistics
- Area: 9,922 km^{2} (3,831 sq mi)
- Population: Total; Catholics: (as of 2004); 2,152,535; 737,821 (34.3%)

Information
- Rite: Latin Rite
- Cathedral: St. Joseph's Cathedral

Current leadership
- Pope: Leo XIV
- Bishop: Salesius Mugambi

The Roman Catholic Diocese of Meru (Latin: Dioecesis Meruensis) is a diocese located in the city of Meru in the ecclesiastical province of Nyeri in Kenya.

== History ==
- March 10, 1926: Established as Apostolic Prefecture of Meru from the Apostolic Vicariate of Kenya
- May 7, 1953: Promoted as Diocese of Meru

== Bishops ==
- Prefects Apostolic of Meru (Roman rite)
  - Fr. Giovanni Balbo, I.M.C. (1926 – 1929)
  - Fr. Carlo Re, I.M.C. (1930 – 16 Sep 1936), concurrently appointed titular bishop and Vicar Apostolic of Nyeri in 1931
  - Fr. José Nepote-Fus, I.M.C. (16 Sep 1936 – 7 Aug 1948), appointed Apostolic Administrator of Rio Branco, Brazil in 1948; future Bishop
  - Fr. Carlo Maria Cavallera, I.M.C. (Apostolic Administrator 1947 – 3 Mar 1954), concurrently appointed Bishop of Nyeri in 1953
- Bishops of Meru (Roman rite)
  - Bishop Lawrence Bessone, I.M.C. (3 Mar 1954 – 7 Apr 1976)
  - Bishop Silas Silvius Njiru (9 Dec 1976 – 18 Mar 2004)
  - Bishop Salesius Mugambi (since 18 Mar 2004)

=== Coadjutor Bishop ===
- Salesius Mugambi (2001-2004)
- Jackson Murugara I.M.C. (since 16 January 2025)

=== Auxiliary Bishop ===
- Silas Silvius Njiru (1975-1976), appointed Bishop here

== Other priests from here named bishops ==
- Obed Muriungi Karobia, named Auxiliary Bishop of Nairobi on 26 March 2026.

== See also ==
- Roman Catholicism in Kenya

== Sources ==
- GCatholic.org
- Catholic Hierarchy
