= Roman Catholic Diocese of Marsabit =

Roman Catholic diocese in Kenya

Diocese of Marsabit Dioecesis Marsabitensis
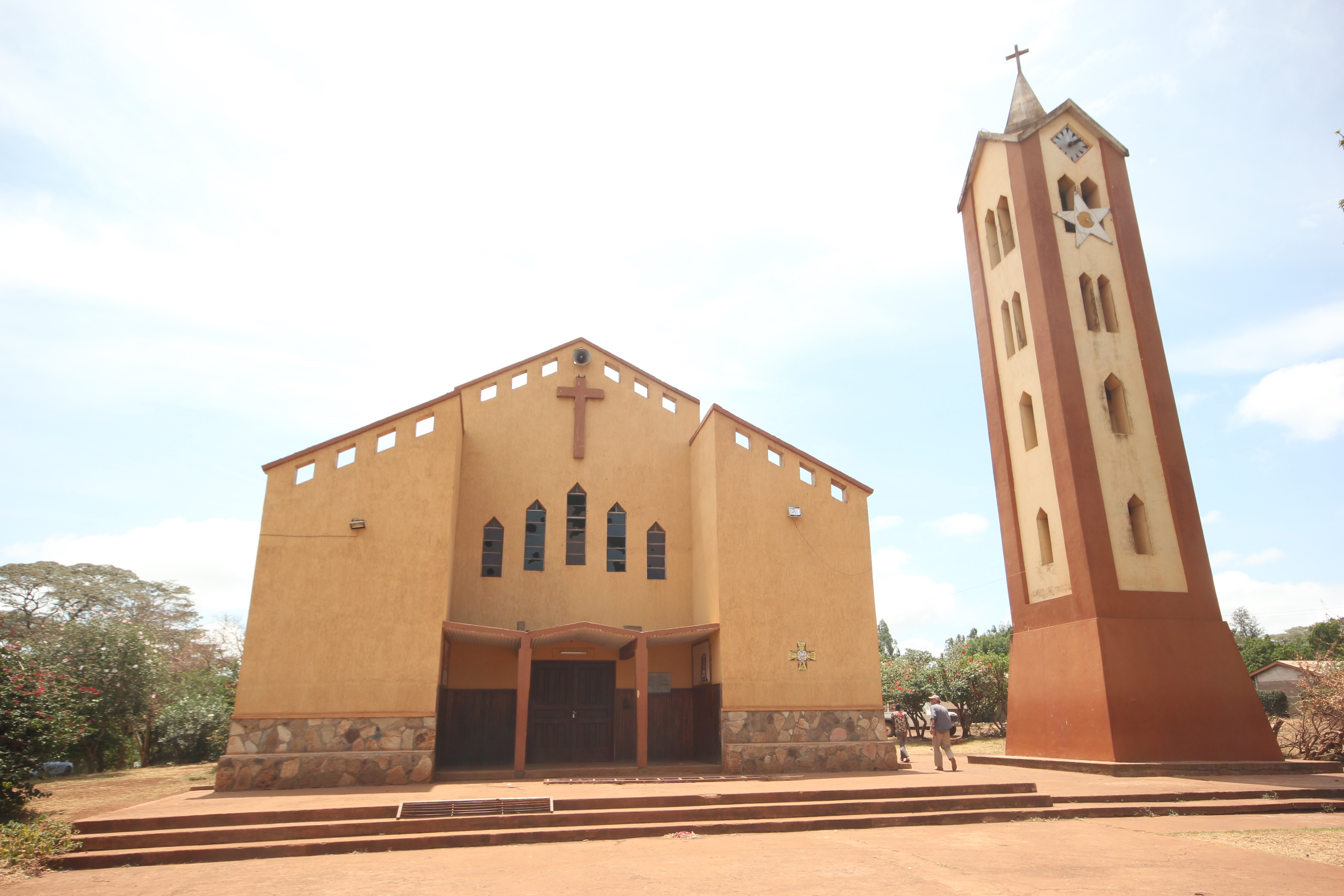
- Consolata Cathedral in Marsabit

Location
- Country: Kenya
- Metropolitan: Nyeri

Statistics
- Area: 78,078 km^{2} (30,146 sq mi)
- Population: Total; Catholics: (as of 2004); 201,266; 22,100 (11.0%)

Information
- Rite: Latin Rite
- Cathedral: Pro-Cathedral of Our Lady of Consolata

Current leadership
- Pope: Leo XIV
- Bishop: Peter Kihara Kariuki, I.M.C.

The Roman Catholic Diocese of Marsabit (Latin: Dioecesis Marsabitensis) is a diocese located in the city of Marsabit in the ecclesiastical province of Nyeri in Kenya. The diocese operates Caritas Marsabit as its development agency.

== History ==
- November 25, 1964: Established as Diocese of Marsabit from the Diocese of Nyeri

== List of bishops ==
- Bishops of Marsabit (Roman rite):
  - Bishop Carlo Maria Cavallera, I.M.C. (25 November 1964 – 1981)
  - Bishop Ambrogio Ravasi, I.M.C. (19 June 1981 – 25 November 2006)
  - Bishop Peter Kihara Kariuki, I.M.C. (since 25 November 2006)

== See also ==
- Roman Catholicism in Kenya

== Sources ==
- GCatholic.org
- Catholic Hierarchy
