= Meru, Kenya =

Meru
- Town
- Location within Kenya
- Coordinates: 0°03′N 37°39′E
- Country: Kenya
- County: Meru County
- Founded: 1911

Population (2019 census)
  - Total: 291,191
- Time zone: UTC+3 (EAT)
- Website: http://meru.go.ke/

Meru is a town in Eastern Kenya just north of the Equator. It is the headquarters of Meru County, and the sixth largest urban area in Kenya. The urban centre had a population of 291,191 residents in the 2019 census.

== Overview ==
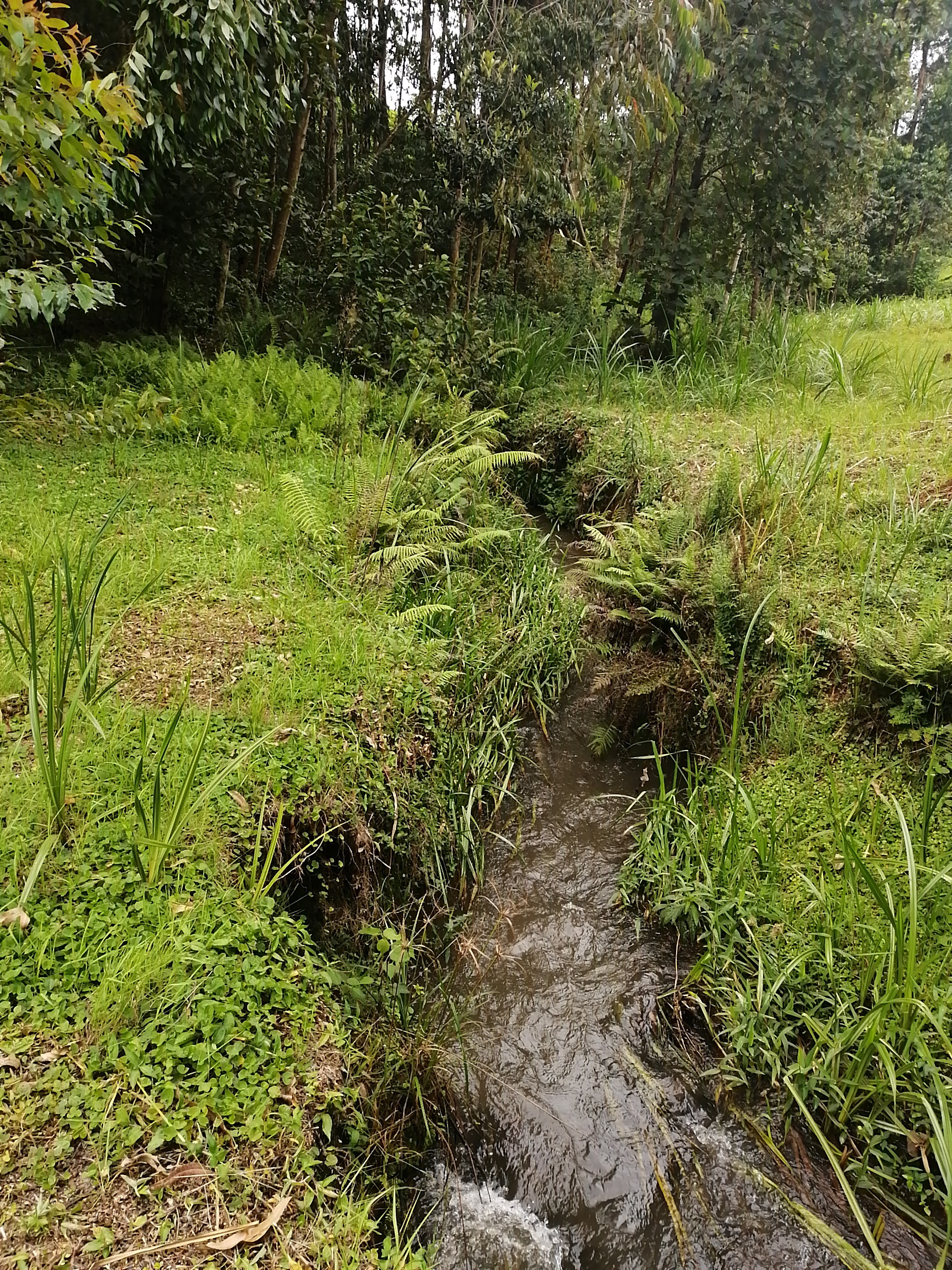
Landscape in Meru County

The town is located at 0.047035 degrees north and 37.649803 degrees east, on the northeast slopes of Mount Kenya. The Kathita River passes through town. The main administrative part of town is on the north side of the Kathita River. The south side of the river is a residential area. Meru Town is about 8 km north of the equator, at an elevation of approximately 1,600 metres (5,200 ft) above the sea level, in an area of mixed forest and clearings, small towns, villages and rural farms. The town is predominantly populated by the Ameru people, a Bantu ethnic group.

== History ==
Meru town's first District Commissioner was Edward Butler Horne. The Meru nicknamed him Kangangi, meaning the little wanderer due to his short stature and the fact that he traveled around Meru a lot as he surveyed the District. This was at a time when the Meru community lived a fairly settled life in communities. The city's foundation in its present location was as a result of the military limitations of E. B. Horne's original camp at Mwitari's (homestead).

In 1912, according to Madeleine Laverne Platts, wife of W. A. F. Platts, Meru's first Assistant District Commissioner:

"Short [E. B.] Horne had laid out a nice little golf course. 500 local girls were paid to cut the grass by plucking it out with their fingers. Next to the golf course stood a large, handsome log house, in which the door opened to reveal mud floors on which a large hat-stand stood gaunt and proud within a pool of water."

As E.B. Horne was settling in Meru, Methodist leaders were seeking expansion. John B. Griffiths, a Welshman minister previously working at the Kenya coast, petitioned the colonial government to grant the entire Embu region to the Methodists as an exclusive religious sphere. The request was denied because the government considered it unsafe. Griffiths then applied a second time, requesting that the comparatively "peaceful" Meru district be regarded as the exclusive sphere of the United Methodist church. In December 1909 the government agreed. Griffiths's party arrived at "Fort Meru" in October 1909, to be met by E. B. Horne who allotted the Methodists a plot of land at Ka-Aga. This was then a spirit forest, known to the Meru as the “place of curse removers [Aga]”, less than 3km north east of his new administrative headquarters.

Griffiths's subsequent report of his expedition described Meru as a land of "hills, valleys, and innumerable streams." He found it

"unlike any other area in Africa: Its hills are covered with ferns, hedges are thick with blackberry bushes, and in the streams watercress abounds . . . [and] mosquitoes are unknown. . . . We have been toiling for fifty years in the sweltering climate of the coast, contending with tremendous difficulties, bitter disappointments and deaths. We have been for years meditating upon seeking another and better country in which our men can live and labor and reap. SIR, HERE IT IS. THE FUTURE OF OUR EAST AFRICAN MISSION LIES HERE. I implore the committee to enter it”.

In January 1912, Griffiths and Reverend Frank Mimmack occupied the allotted site and begun construction of the first buildings. They were later joined by Rev. Reginald T. Worthington. This site in Kaaga has grown to be Meru's Education Centre, with a National School, A leading school for students with special needs, two provincial schools and two Primary schools.

In 1956, The Methodist Mission approached the Meru County Council and requested to be allotted land. Their request was granted and they were allotted 50 acres of land where they established the Methodist Training Institute in 1958. This institute grew over the years and merged with two other colleges to become The Kenya Methodist University.

== Climate ==
Meru has a cool subtropical highland climate (Csb) with heavy rainfall from March to May and October to December. It has little rainfall in January and February and from June to September.

Climate data for Meru
Month	Jan	Feb	Mar	Apr	May	Jun	Jul	Aug	Sep	Oct	Nov	Dec	Year
Mean daily maximum °C (°F)	27.3 (81.1)	28.3 (82.9)	28.8 (83.8)	27.8 (82.0)	26.6 (79.9)	25.3 (77.5)	24.6 (76.3)	25.2 (77.4)	27.4 (81.3)	28.3 (82.9)	26.7 (80.1)	26.2 (79.2)	26.9 (80.4)
Daily mean °C (°F)	18.7 (65.7)	19.3 (66.7)	19.7 (67.5)	19.3 (66.7)	18.4 (65.1)	17.3 (63.1)	16.7 (62.1)	17.2 (63.0)	18.5 (65.3)	19.4 (66.9)	18.7 (65.7)	18.1 (64.6)	18.4 (65.2)
Mean daily minimum °C (°F)	10.1 (50.2)	10.3 (50.5)	10.7 (51.3)	10.8 (51.4)	10.2 (50.4)	9.3 (48.7)	8.9 (48.0)	9.2 (48.6)	9.7 (49.5)	10.6 (51.1)	10.7 (51.3)	10.1 (50.2)	10.0 (50.1)
Average precipitation mm (inches)	52 (2.0)	40 (1.6)	128 (5.0)	332 (13.1)	160 (6.3)	11 (0.4)	13 (0.5)	16 (0.6)	22 (0.9)	294 (11.6)	386 (15.2)	148 (5.8)	1,602 (63)
Source: Climate-Data.org

== Transport ==
The town of Meru is linked to Nairobi by a tarmac road named B6, from the south around the east side of Mount Kenya, via Embu, or from the northwest around the west and north side of Mount Kenya, via Nanyuki and Timau. An international airport is situated at Isiolo, 35 Kilometres away, via a new tarmac road through Ruiri. Within the town, the roads have seen a lot of improvement after the maintenance of urban roads was transferred to the Kenya Urban Roads Authority, which established its Upper Eastern Regional Headquarters in Meru.

== Tourism and hospitality ==
Meru town is a jumping-off place for Samburu and Buffalo Springs National Reserves and Lewa Conservancy, all some distance north of Meru, with Samburu and Buffalo Springs via Isiolo, and Meru National Park, to the northeast of Meru, via Maua in the Nyambene Hills.

The Meru Museum is housed in Meru's first District Commissioner's Office, built by E. B. Horne. It preserves the historical and cultural artifacts of the Meru people.

At Rutundu log cabins 20 kilometres west of Meru City that Prince William proposed to the Duchess of Cambridge. The Meru side of Mt. Kenya National Park has tourist attractions including Vivvien Falls, Theemwe Salt lick, Ithanguni Hill, Lake Alice, Lake Ellis and Sacred Lake.

== Commerce ==
Meru town is the Commercial capital of Northern and Eastern Kenya. It hosts a Central Bank of Kenya’s Currency Centre serving the North Eastern Half of Kenya. Meru has 22 bank branches. Kenya's Banks, Equity, Postbank, Barclays, Standard Chartered Co-Operative, Diamond Trust, National Bank and Family Bank, CBA, Fina Bank, K-rep Bank, Eco-BAnk, CFC stanbic, NIC, Housing Finance, KCB, Bank of Baroda, have branches in the town while several micro-finance institutions are also available. Mwalimu Cooperative Savings & Credit Society Limited, (Mwalimu Sacco), the largest Sacco in Kenya, maintains a branch in Meru. The town is the business and agricultural centre for north-eastern Kenya.

== Education ==
Meru town is an educational centre for the Eastern and northeast of Kenya. There are many primary and secondary schools, including the Meru Primary, Meru School, Kaaga Girls, Kaaga Boys just to name a few. There are also technical schools, the Meru National Polytechnic and Nkabune Technical Institute being the major ones. There are also teacher training colleges, campuses of various universities including Mount Kenya University, Nairobi, among others. Its main universities are, Meru University of Science and Technology (MUST) and Kenya Methodist University, both of which have their main campus within and near Meru town.

Other institutions of higher learning in Meru town include:

- Kenya Medical Training College, Meru Campus
- Africa Nazarene University, Meru Campus
- University of Nairobi Extra Mural Centre situated in the Posta Building
- Kenya Institute of Management – Alexander House

Meru County has both public and private schools. However, some children are orphaned and vulnerable so cannot access formal education. NGOs such as Ripples International campaigns for the protection of such children. It also has a model primary school called the Nahal Academy.
