= Archdiocese of Nyeri =

Roman Catholic archdiocese in Kenya

Coordinates: 0.4263°S 36.9528°E

Archdiocese of Nyeri Archidioecesis Nyeriensis
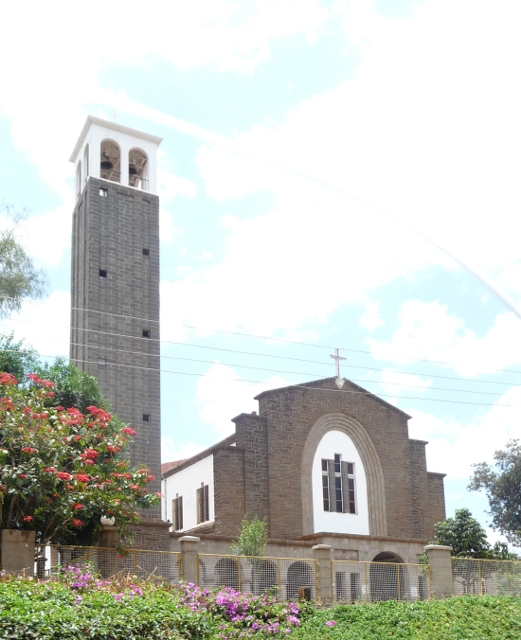
- Nyeri Cathedral

Location
- Country: Kenya

Statistics
- Area: 8,450 km^{2} (3,260 sq mi)
- Population: Total; Catholics: 1,723,680; 588,900 (34.2%)
- Parishes: 52

Information
- Denomination: Catholicism
- Sui iuris church: Latin Church
- Rite: Roman
- Established: September 14, 1905
- Cathedral: Our Lady of Consolata, Nyeri
- Secular priests: 161
- Metropolitan Archbishop: Anthony Muheria
- Suffragans: Embu, Isiolo, Maralal, Marsabit, Meru, Murang'a, Nyahururu
- Bishops emeritus: Peter J. Kairo

The Roman Catholic Archdiocese of Nyeri (Latin: Archidioecesis Nyeriensis) is the Metropolitan See for the ecclesiastical province of Nyeri, one of four in Kenya, Eastern Africa, yet depends on the missionary Roman Congregation for the Evangelization of Peoples.

The cathedral episcopal see of the archbishop is Our Lady of Consolata Cathedral, in Nyeri.

== History ==
- September 14, 1905: Established as Mission “sui iuris” of Kenya, on colonial territory split off from the then Apostolic Vicariate of Northern Zanguebar (now Archdiocese of Nairobi)
- July 12, 1909: Promoted as Apostolic Vicariate of Kenya, hence entitled to a titular bishop by papal brief Supremi Apostolatus by Pius IX
- March 10, 1926: Renamed after its see as Apostolic Vicariate of Nyeri, having lost territory to establish the then Apostolic Prefecture of Meru (now a suffragan diocese)
- March 23, 1953: Promoted as Diocese of Nyeri by papal bulla Quemadmodum ad Nos by Pius XII
- Lost territory on 25 November 1964 to establish the Diocese of Marsabit, now a suffragan
- Lost territory again on 17 March 1983 to establish the Diocese of Murang’a, again a suffragan
- May 21, 1990: Promoted as Metropolitan Archdiocese of Nyeri by papal bulla Cum in Keniana di papa by John Paul II
- Lost territory on 5 December 2002 to establish the Diocese of Nyahururu, as a suffragan.

== Ecclesiastical Province ==
Its ecclesiastical province comprises the Metropolitan's own Archdiocese and the following Suffragan sees :

- Roman Catholic Diocese of Embu
- Roman Catholic Diocese of Maralal
- Roman Catholic Diocese of Marsabit, daughter
- Roman Catholic Diocese of Meru, daughter
- Roman Catholic Diocese of Muranga, daughter
- Roman Catholic Diocese of Nyahururu, daughter

== Statistics ==
As per 2014, it pastorally served 490,000 Catholics (34.2% of 1,434,000 total) on 8,450 km² in 48 parishes and 39 missions with 133 priests (121 diocesan, 12 religious), 222 lay religious (72 brothers, 150 sisters) and 73 seminarians.

== Bishops ==
(all Roman rite)

=== Ordinaries ===
Ecclesiastical superiors of Missio sui iuris of Kenya : not available

Apostolic Vicars of Kenya

- Filippo Perlo, Consolata Missionaries (I.M.C.) (born Italy) (15 Jul 1909 – 18 Nov 1925), Titular Bishop of Maronea (15 Jul 1909 – 4 Nov 1948), later Superior General of Consolata Missionaries (16 Feb 1926 – retired 11 Jan 1929), died 1948
- Giuseppe Perrachon, I.M.C. (born Italy) (18 Dec 1925 – 4 Jan 1926 see below), Titular Bishop of Centuria (18 Dec 1925 – death 14 Apr 1944)

Apostolic Vicars of Nyeri

- Bishop-elect Giuseppe Perrachon, I.M.C. (see above 4 Jan 1926 – retired 18 Oct 1930), Titular Bishop of Centuria (18 Dec 1925 – death 14 Apr 1944)
- Carlo Re, I.M.C. (14 Dec 1931 – 1947) (born Italy), Titular Bishop of Hadrumetum (14 Dec 1931 – 29 Dec 1951), also Apostolic Administrator of Meru (Kenya) (1932 – 16 Sep 1936), later Bishop of Ampurias (Italy) (29 Dec 1951 – 10 Feb 1961) and Bishop of Civita–Tempio (Italy) (29 Dec 1951 – retired 10 Feb 1961), emeritate as Titular Bishop of Aspona (10 Feb 1961 – death 12 Aug 1978)
- Carlo Maria Cavallera, I.M.C. (19 Jun 1947 – 25 Mar 1953 see below), Titular Bishop of Sufes (19 Jun 1947 – 25 Mar 1953), also Apostolic Administrator of Meru (Kenya) (1947 – 3 Mar 1954)

Suffragan Bishops of Nyeri

- Carlo Maria Cavallera, I.M.C. (born Italy) (see above 25 Mar 1953 – 25 Nov 1964), later Bishop of Marsabit (Kenya) (25 Nov 1964 – retired 1981), died 1990
- Caesar Gatimu (25 Nov 1964 – death 20 Feb 1987) (first native incumbent), previously Titular Bishop of Abila in Palaestina (18 Apr 1961 – 25 Nov 1964) & Auxiliary Bishop of Nyeri (18 Apr 1961 – 25 Nov 1964)
- Nicodemus Kirima (12 Mar 1988 – 21 May 1990 see below), previously Bishop of Mombasa (Kenya) (27 Feb 1978 – 12 Mar 1988); also President of Kenya Conference of Catholic Bishops (1988 – 1991 and 1989 – 1997)

Metropolitan Archbishops of Nyeri

- Nicodemus Kirima (see above 21 May 1990 - death 27 Nov 2007)
  - Apostolic Administrator (2007.12 – 19 Apr 2008) John Njue, while Metropolitan Archbishop of Nairobi (Kenya) (6 Oct 2007 – ...) and Cardinal-Priest of Preziosissimo Sangue di Nostro Signore Gesù Cristo (24 Nov 2007 [17 Feb 2008] – ...); previously Bishop of Embu (Kenya) (9 Jun 1986 – 9 Mar 2002), President of Kenya Conference of Catholic Bishops (1997 – 2003), Coadjutor Archbishop of Nyeri (9 Mar 2002 – 6 Oct 2007), Apostolic Administrator of Diocese of Isiolo (Kenya) (2005 – 25 Jan 2006), President of Kenya Conference of Catholic Bishops (2006 – 2015), Apostolic Administrator of Roman Catholic Diocese of Muranga (Kenya) (2006.11 – 4 Apr 2009)
- Peter Joseph Kairo (19 April 2008 - retired 23 April 2017), previously Bishop of Murang’a (Kenya) (17 Mar 1983 – 21 Apr 1997), Bishop of Nakuru (Kenya) (21 Apr 1997 – 19 Apr 2008)
- Anthony Muheria (23 Apr 2017 – ...): previously Bishop of Embu (Kenya) (30 Oct 2003 – 28 Jun 2008), Bishop of Kitui (Kenya) (28 Jun 2008 – 23 Apr 2017), Apostolic Administrator of Diocese of Machakos (Kenya) (2015.02 – 23 Apr 2017).

=== Coadjutor Archbishop ===
- John Njue (2002-2007), did not succeed to see; appointed Archbishop of Nairobi (Cardinal in 2007)

=== Auxiliary Bishop ===
- Caesar Gatimu (1961-1964), appointed Bishop here

=== Other priests of this diocese who became bishops ===
- James Maria Wainaina Kungu (priest here, 1984-2002), appointed Bishop of Muranga in 2009
- Joseph Ndembu Mbatia (priest here, 1989-2003), appointed Bishop of Nyahururu in 2011

== Parishes by Deanery ==
The Archdiocese of Nyeri consists of eight Deaneries, which comprise the following parishes :

- Nyeri Municipality Deanery
  - Cathedral Parish
  - St. Jude Parish
  - King’ong’o Parish
  - Mwenji Parish
  - Kiamuiru Parish
  - Mathari Institutions Chaplaincy
  - St. Charles Lwanga Parish
- Mukurwe-ini Deanery
  - Mukurwe-ini Parish
  - Kaheti Parish
  - Kimondo Parish
  - Gikondi Parish
- Othaya Deanery
  - Othaya Parish
  - Kariko Parish
  - Birithia Parish
  - Karima Parish
  - Kagicha Parish
  - Karuthi Parish
  - Kigumo Parish
- Nanyuki Deanery
  - Nanyuki Parish
  - Dol Dol Parish
  - Matanya Parish
  - St. Teresa Parish
  - Kalalu Parish
- Narumoru Deanery
  - Narumoru Town Parish
  - Irigithathi Parish
  - Thegu Parish
  - Arch-angel Michael Chaka Parish
  - Munyu Parish
- Karatina Deanery
  - Karatina Parish
  - Miiri Parish
  - Giakaibei Parish
  - Gikumbo Parish
  - Gathugu Parish
  - Ngandu Parish
  - Kabiru-ini Parish
  - Kahira-ini Parish
- Tetu Deanery
  - Tetu Parish
  - Wamagana Parish
  - Kigogo-ini Parish
  - Itheguri Parish
  - Gititu Parish
  - Kangaita Parish
  - Giakanja Parish
  - Karangia Parish (Karangia LC, Mathakwaini LC, Kiambugu LC, Ihithe LC, Hubuini LC)*Local Church
- Gatarakwa Deanery
  - Mweiga Parish
  - Endarasha Parish
  - Gatarakwa Parish
  - Karemeno Parish
  - Mugunda Parish
  - Sirima Parish
  - Winyumiririe Parish
  - Kamariki Parish

== Contacts ==
Nyeri Catholic Secretariat, P.O. Box 288 - 10100, Nyeri. Tel: +254 721 785 169

== See also ==
- Archdiocese of Nyeri
- List of Catholic dioceses in Kenya
- Kenya Conference of Catholic Bishops
