= Consolata Missionaries =

Catholic clerical religious congregation

Institute of Consolata Missionaries
- Institutum Missionum a Consolata
- The Logo of the Consolata Missionaries
- Abbreviation: I.M.C.
- Formation: 29 January 1901; 125 years ago
- Founder: St. Giuseppe Allamano
- Members: 947 members (737 priests) as of 2018
- Superior General: Fr. James Bhola Lengarin, I.M.C.
- Parent organization: Roman Catholic Church
- Website: https://www.consolata.org/

The Institute of Consolata Missionaries (Latin: Institutum Missionum a Consolata), commonly called the Consolata Missionaries, is a Catholic religious congregation of Pontifical right with branches for both men and women. Its members add the nominal I.M.C. after their names to indicate membership in the Institute.

The Institute was established in 1901 by the Italian priest Saint Giuseppe Allamano in Turin. He established a branch of the order for women, the Consolata Missionary Sisters, in 1910.

Its headquarters is in Viale della Mura Aurelie 11-13, Rome, Italy. In 2018, the congregation had 227 houses, 947 members (737 priests). Superiors of the institute include:

- Bishop Filippo Perlo (1926–1929)
- Domenico Fiorina (1949–1969)
- Mario Bianchi (1970–1981)
- Giuseppe Inverardi (1982–1993)
- Pietro Trabucco, I.M.C. (1993–2005)
- Aquileo Fiorentini, I.M.C. (2005–2011)
- Fr. Stefano Camerlengo, I.M.C. (2011–2023)
- Fr. James Bhola Lengarin, I.M.C. (2023–present)

== Prelates from their ranks ==
Deceased (by year of death)

- 1930: Fr. Giuseppe Balbo, Apostolic Prefect of Meru (Kenya)
- 1933: Fr. Gaudenzio Barlassina, Apostolic Prefect of Kaffa (Ethiopia)
- 1935: Fr. Francesco Cagliero, Prefect Apostolic of Iringa (Tanzania)
- 1944: Bishop Giuseppe Perrachon, Apostolic Vicar emeritus of Nyeri (Kenya)
- 1948: Bishop Gabriele Perlo, Apostolic Vicar emeritus of Mogadishu (Somalia)
- 1948: Bishop Filippo Perlo, Apostolic Vicar emeritus of Kenya (Kenya) and Superior General emeritus of Consolata Missionaries
- 1953: Bishop Luigi Santa, Bishop of Rimini (Italy)
- 1960: Bishop Antonio Torasso, Apostolic Vicar of Florencia (Colombia)
- 1965: Bishop Attilio Beltramino, Bishop of Iringa (Tanzania)
- 1966: Bishop José Nepote-Fus, Bishop Prelate Emeritus of Roraima (Brazil)
- 1976: Bishop Lawrence Victor Bessone, Bishop of Meru (Kenya)
- 1978: Bishop Carlo Re, Bishop Emeritus of Ampurias e Tempio (Italy)
- 1990: Bishop Carlo Maria Cavallera, Bishop emeritus of Marsabit (Kenya)
- 2012: Bishop Angelo Cuniberti, Apostolic Vicar emeritus of Florencia (Colombia)
- 2014: Bishop José Luis Serna Alzate, Bishop emeritus of Líbano–Honda (Colombia)
- 2014: Bishop Servílio Conti, Bishop-Prelate emeritus of Roraima (Brazil)
- 2022: Archbishop Luis Augusto Castro Quiroga, Metropolitan Archbishop emeritus of Tunja (Colombia)

Alive

- Cardinal Giorgio Marengo, Apostolic Prefect of Ulaanbataar (Mongolia)
- Bishop Evaristo Marc Chengula, Bishop of Mbeya (Tanzania)
- Bishop Giovanni Crippa, Bishop of Estância (Brazil)
- Bishop Carillo Gritti, Bishop-Prelate of Itacoatiara (Brazil)
- Bishop Anthony Ireri Mukobo, Apostolic Vicar of Isiolo (Kenya) and Titular Bishop of Rusguniæ
- Bishop Peter Munguti Makau, Bishop of Isiolo (Kenya)
- Bishop Peter Kihara Kariuki, Bishop of Marsabit (Kenya)
- Bishop Francisco Lerma Martínez, Bishop of Gurué (Mozambique)
- Bishop Aldo Mongiano, Bishop Emeritus of Roraima (Brazil)
- Bishop Francisco Javier Múnera Correa, Apostolic Vicar of San Vicente del Caguán (Colombia) and Titular Bishop of Aquæ novæ in Numidia
- Bishop Hieronymus Emusugut Joya, Bishop of Maralal (Kenya)
- Bishop Virgilio Pante, Bishop Emeritus of Maralal (Kenya)
- Bishop Joaquím Humberto Pinzón Güiza, Apostolic Vicar of Puerto Leguízamo–Solano (Colombia) and Titular Bishop of Otočac
- Bishop José Luís Gerardo Ponce de León, Bishop of Manzini (Swaziland).
- Bishop Elio Rama, Bishop of Pinheiro (Brazil)
- Bishop Ambrogio Ravasi, Bishop Emeritus of Marsabit (Kenya)
- Bishop Inácio Saure, Bishop of Tete (Mozambique)
- Bishop Walmir Alberto Valle, Bishop emeritus of Joaçaba (Brazil)
- Fr. Alberto Trevisiol, Rector Magnificus of the Pontifical Urbaniana University
- Bishop Jackson Murugara, Coadjutor Bishop of Meru (Kenya)
- Abbot Donato Ogliari, O.S.B., abbot of Saint Paul Outside the Walls (Took vows as a Consolata in 1978, ordained as a priest for the Institute in 1982, left the Institute in 1987 to enter the Benedictines.)
