= Sebastian Sebastiani =

Italian sculptor

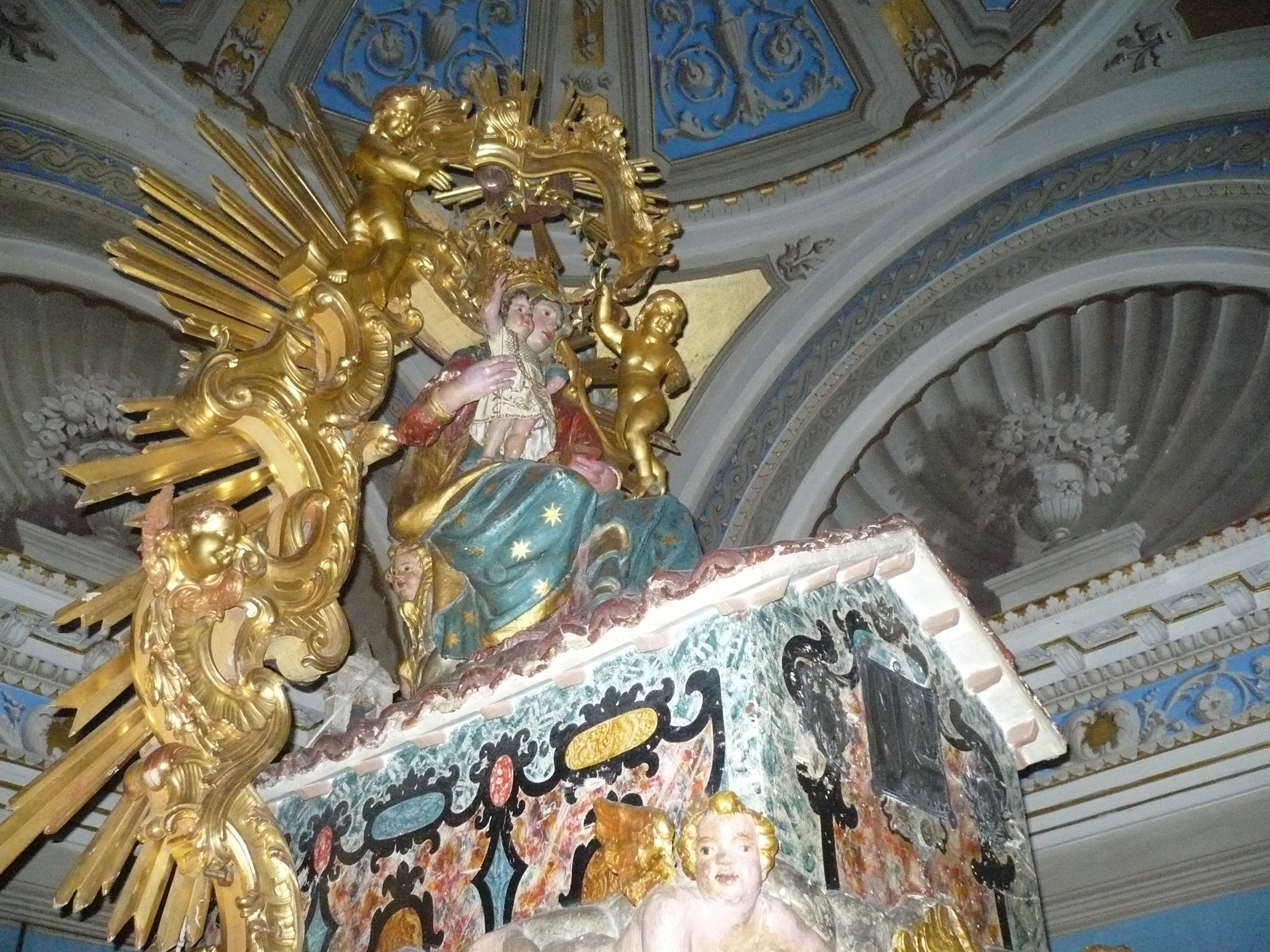
Madonna, bronze statue by Sebastian Sebastiani, St. John's Cathedral in Ripatransone

Sebastian Sebastiani (died 1626) was an Italian sculptor and founder. His exact date of birth is unknown.

Born in Camerino, Sebastiani trained in the workshop of Girolamo Lombardo in Recanati, and collaborated with several smelters. The workshop often huddled pacts to cope with the commission volumes, so that often the works of these sculptors are teamwork and can hardly be attributed to only one of them. He oversaw the process of bronze casting for the monument to Pope Paul V. He contributed to the main door right side of the Basilica della Santa Casa along with Tiburzio Vergelli. He died in 1626 in Recanati.
