= Giuseppe de Rossi =

Giuseppe de Rossi may refer to:

- Giuseppe de Rossi (archbishop of Acerenza e Matera) (died 1610), Italian Roman Catholic Bishop of Ugento, Bishop of L'Aquila, and Archbishop of Acerenza e Matera
- Giuseppe de Rossi (bishop of Umbriatico) (1610–1659), Italian Roman Catholic bishop
- Giuseppe de Rossi (composer) (died 1719 or 1720), Italian composer and choir conductor
