= Tiburzio Vergelli =

Italian sculptor

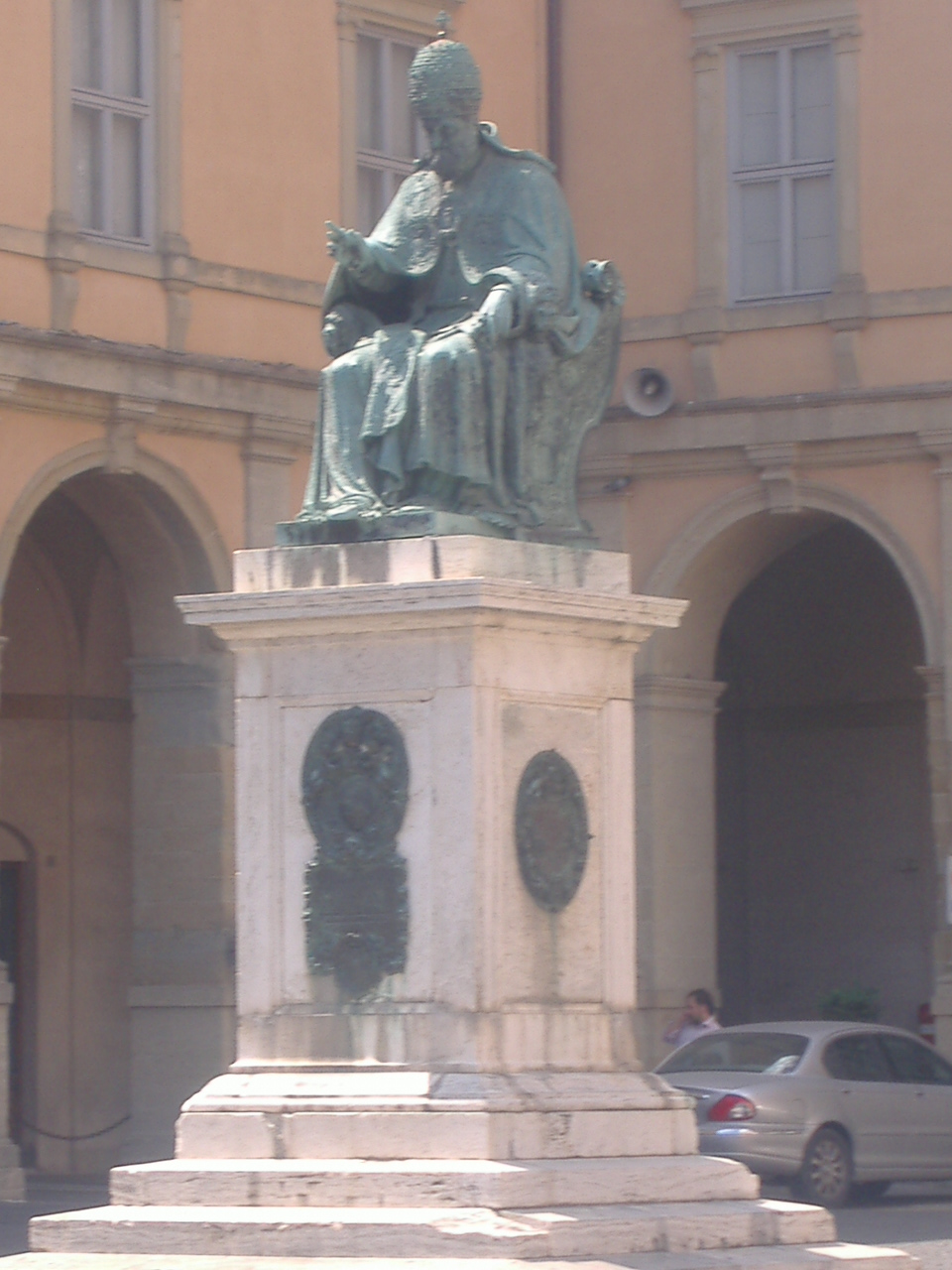
Pope Sixtus V, bronze statue by Tiburzio Vergelli, Piazza Cavour in Camerino

Tiburzio Vergelli (1551-1609) was an Italian sculptor and founder.

Born in Camerino, Vergelli was a highly skilled metal smelter. He trained in the workshop of Antonio Calcagni and Girolamo Lombardo in Recanati. His first work is the statue of Pope Sixtus V, given to his hometown Camerino. In the aftermath of the election of a new Pope, this statue was done around the same time as Calcagni was working on a similar statue for Loreto, Marche (1585–1587) and follows the same compositional scheme. This generated a split between the two, who subsequently contributed separately to the main door of the Basilica della Santa Casa; Calcagni was entrusted to the door of the south side, and the north side was given to Vergelli. Vergelli worked with Sebastian Sebastiani and Giovan Battista Vitali for the baptismal font between 1600 and 1608. He died in 1609 in Recanati.
