= Calcagni =

Calcagni is a surname of Italian origin. Notable people with the surname include:

- Antonio Calcagni (1538–1593), Italian sculptor
- Filippo Calcagni (born 1980), Italian DJ (also known as DJ Mad Dog)
- Patrick Calcagni (born 1977), Swiss professional road bicycle racer
- Ron Calcagni (1957), American former football quarterback
- Tiberio Calcagni (1532–1565), Italian sculptor
