= Antonio Calcagni =

Italian sculptor (1538–1593)

Antonio Calcagni (1538 in Recanati – 1593) was an Italian sculptor of the Renaissance period.

He apprenticed with Girolamo Lombardo in Recanati, where he completed a statue of Pope Gregory XIII (1574) started by Ludovico Lombardi and Ascoli. He also completed a statue of the poet Annibale Caro in bronze. He also completed bronze reliefs for the Basilica of Loreto. He collaborated with a younger Tiburzio Vergelli. He designed the monumental entry doors to the church of Loreto, but these were completed by his nephew Tarquinio Jacometti and his pupil Sebastiano Sebastiani.

== Works ==
- Monument to Cardinal Niccolò Caetani di Sermoneta (1580) Basilica, Loreto
- Bronze relief of Deposition, Basilica, Massilla Chapel, Loreto
- Medallion depicting Barbara Massilla, Basilica, Massilla Chapel, Loreto
- Depiction of Father Dantini, Church of Sant'Agostino, Recanati
- Virgin and child, Villa Coloredo Mels, Recanati
- Monument to Pope Sixtus V (1587), Piazzale della Basilica, Loreto
- Monument in bronze of Agostino Filago (1592), Basilica, Loreto
- Monumental South door, Basilica, Loreto

== Sources ==
- Boni, Filippo de' (1852). Biografia degli artisti ovvero dizionario della vita e delle opere dei pittori, degli scultori, degli intagliatori, dei tipografi e dei musici di ogni nazione che fiorirono da'tempi più remoti sino á nostri giorni. Seconda Edizione.. Venice; Googlebooks: Presso Andrea Santini e Figlio. p. 167.
