= Battle of Mariazell =

1805 battle during the War of the Third Coalition

- Part of the Napoleonic Wars
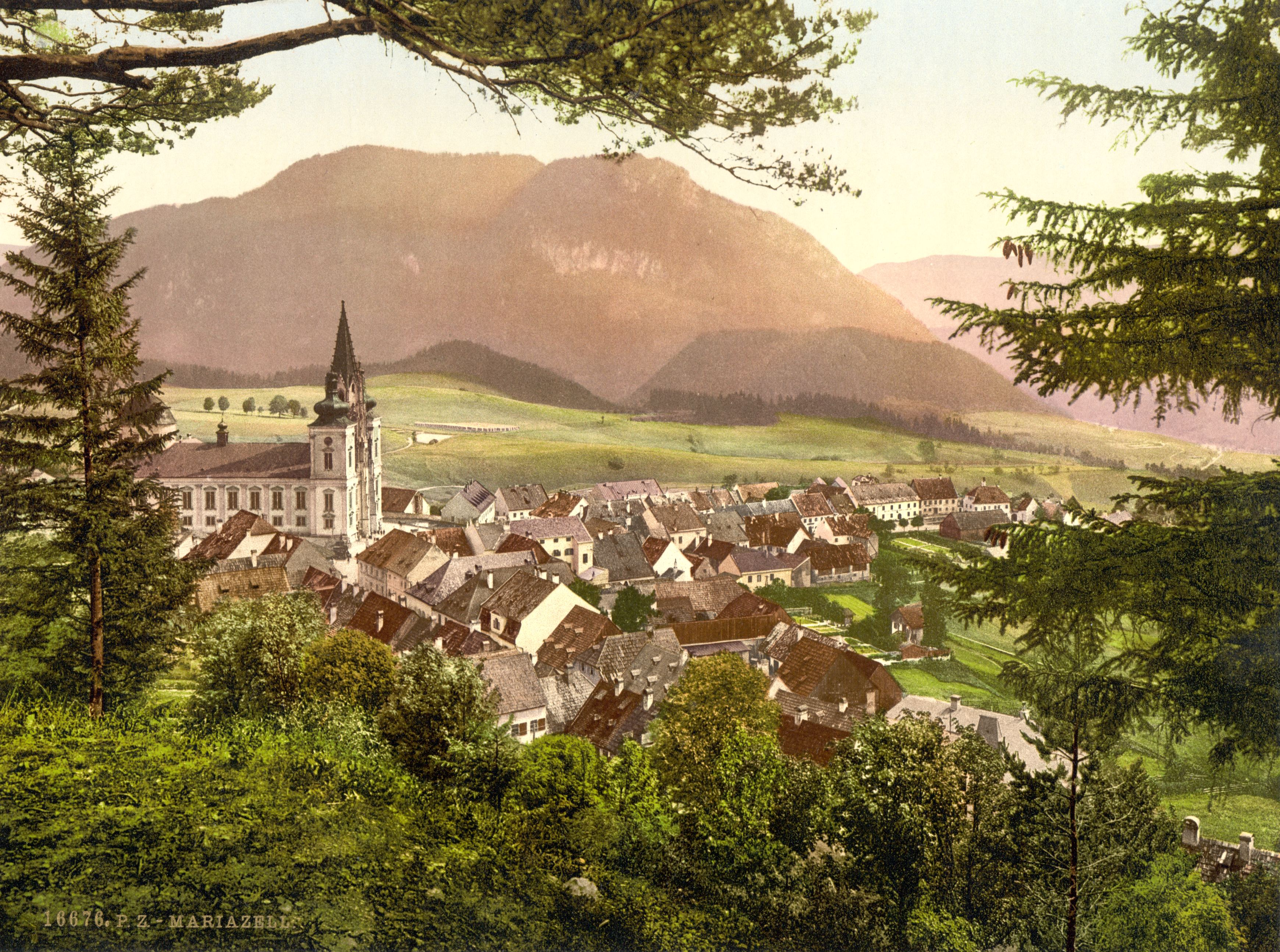
- Mariazell as it appeared around 1900
Date	8 November 1805
Location	Mariazell, Austria 47.7731°N 15.3164°E
Result	French victory

Belligerents
France	Austrian Empire

Commanders and leaders
(France) Étienne Heudelet	(Holy Roman Empire) Count of Merveldt

Units involved
III Corps (elements)	Merveldt's Corps

Strength
3,800	4,000 engaged 7,000 total

Casualties and losses
Light	4,000; 16 guns

War of the Third Coalition:
Austria
current battle
Napoleon in command
Napoleon not in command

The Battle of Mariazell or Battle of Grossraming (8 November 1805) saw the advance guard of the French III Corps attack a retreating Austrian force led by Maximilian, Count of Merveldt. The action occurred during the War of the Third Coalition, which is part of the Napoleonic Wars. Mariazell is located in the Austrian province of Styria, about 50 kilometres (31 mi) south of St. Pölten.

== Battle ==
The advance guard, led by Étienne Heudelet de Bierre, overwhelmed their demoralized enemies, capturing about half of them. Marshal Louis Davout commanded the III Corps.

The 1805 war began with the Ulm Campaign, which was disastrous for Austria, with only the corps of Michael von Kienmayer and Franz Jellacic escaping envelopment by the Grande Armée of Napoleon. As Kienmayer's columns fled to the east, they joined with elements of the Russian Empire's army in a rear guard action at the Battle of Amstetten on 5 November. Davout's III Corps caught up with Merveldt's division at Mariazell a few days later. The Austrian soldiers, their morale shaken by continuous retreating, were routed after a brief struggle.

== Aftermath ==
On 12 November, Austria's capital Vienna fell to the French without a fight. The Battle of Austerlitz would decide the war's outcome in early December.
