= Idolino =

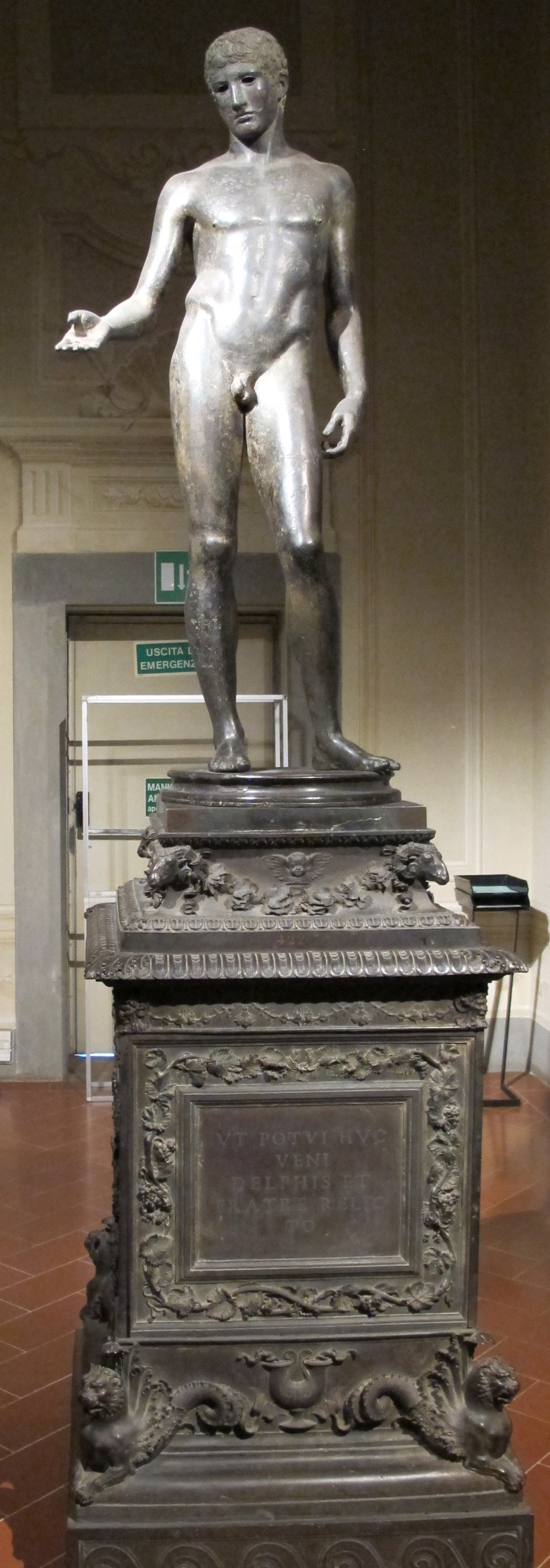

The Idolino, or Idolino of Pesaro, is a Roman bronze statue of a nude youth in contrapposto, standing 146 cm high, made in approximately 30 B.C. It is a copy of a Greek sculpture in the style of Polyclitus made in approximately 440 B.C. It received the name "Idolino," which is Italian for "Little Idol," in the 19th century.

The statue represents a youth with his right hand outstretched. Originally thought to be a statue of Bacchus, it is now believed to have been used to hold an oil lamp at dinner parties. It was influenced by the Doryphoros of Polyclitus.

The statue is on a bronze and silver base, 152 cm high, made in 1530-40 by Aurelio, Ludovico, and Girolamo Lombardo. Because of the mistaken belief that the statue was of Bacchus, the base is decorated in honor of that god. The front of the base bears an inscription by Pietro Bembo; the sides bear scenes of the triumph of Ariadne and of the sacrifice of a goat in a Bacchic rite. The pedestal is assembled from four large sections of hollow, four-sided moldings; its ornamental vocabulary suggests an altar.

The statue was unearthed in 1530 in a Roman villa in Pesaro and came into the possession of Francesco Maria I della Rovere, the Duke of Urbino. The statue was preserved almost intact; only the right hand had to be restored. The fragmented bronze vine that was found with the statue and originally held in the right hand was no longer attached; that vine led to the misidentification as Bacchus. In 1630, the statue was bequeathed by the Medici and transferred to Florence as a gift celebrating the wedding of Vittoria della Rovere and Ferdinand II, Grand Duke of Tuscany. After interim installations in the Uffizi and a "guest stay" in Palermo 1800–1803, when it was necessary to avoid the risk of requisition by Napoleon and to keep the statue in a safe place, the statue was permanently located in 1897 in the Archaeological Museum of Florence.
