= Mariazell Basilica =

Roman Catholic church building in Mariazell, Austria

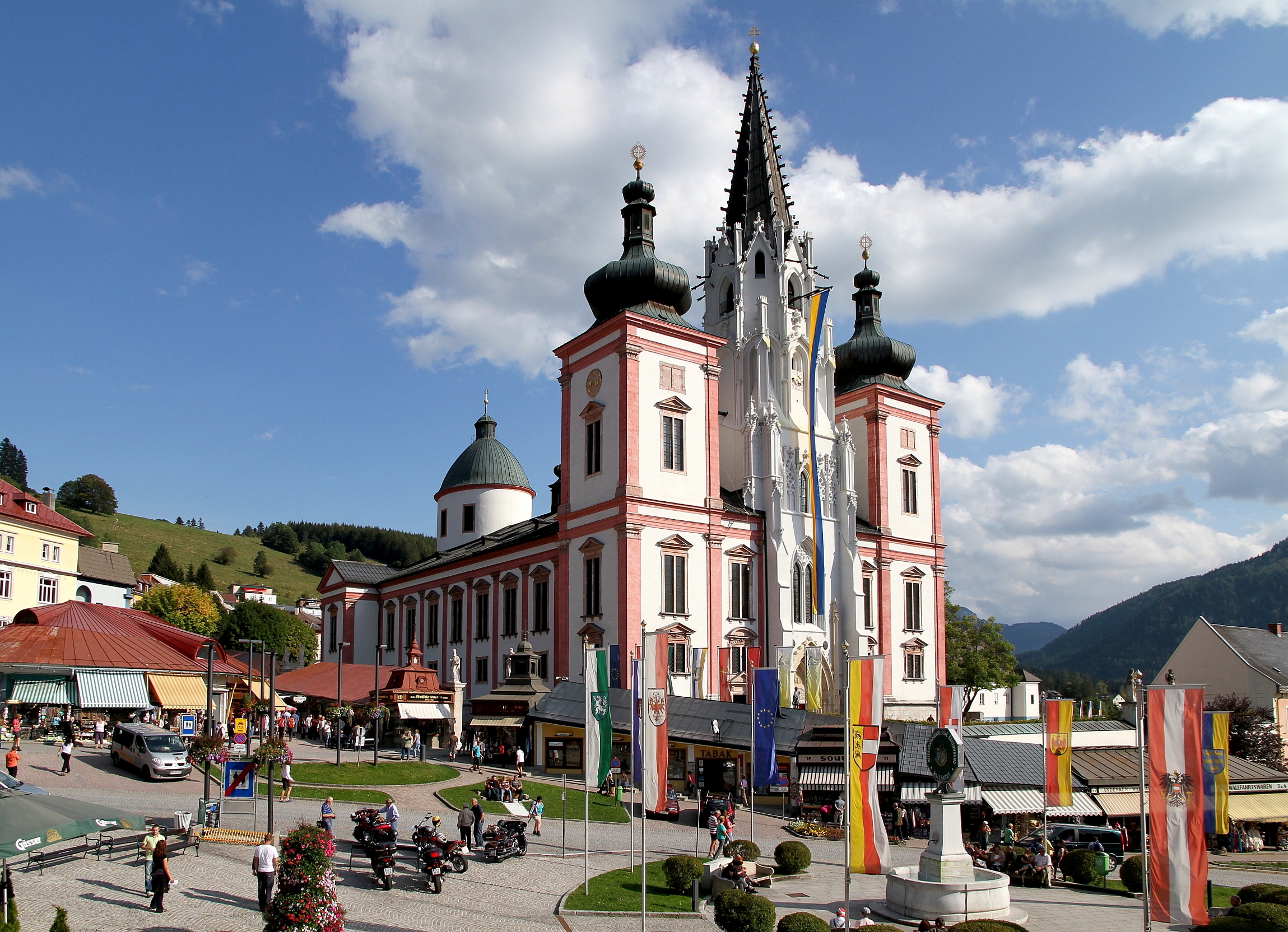
- Mariazell Basilica

- Location within Austria

Religion
- Affiliation: Catholic Church
- Ecclesiastical or organisational status: Basilica
- Status: Active

Location
- Location: Mariazell, Austria
- State: Styria
- Coordinates: 47°46′22″N 15°19′06″E

Architecture
- Architect: Domenico Sciassia
- Type: Church
- Style: Gothic, Baroque
- Groundbreaking: 1644
- Completed: 1683

Mariazell Basilica, also known as Basilica Mariä Geburt (Basilica of the Birth of the Virgin Mary), is a Roman Catholic church building in Mariazell, Austria. It is the most important Christian pilgrimage destination in Austria and one of the most visited shrines in Europe. In the church, a miraculous wooden image of the Virgin Mary is venerated.

Pope Pius X personally raised the sanctuary to the status of a minor basilica by a Motu proprio on 10 November 1907. Later, he ensured the coronation of the Marian image by a decree on 8 September 1908. Mariazell is the only church named as a national shrine of all German-speaking countries.

== Early history ==
The territory around Mariazell was given to St. Lambert's Abbey around 1103, and the monks built a cell in order to serve the local residents. Tradition gives the town's founding day as December 21, 1157, but it is first documented in 1243. A Marian altar was dedicated in 1266.

== The current church building ==
=== The Basilica of the Mariä Geburt ===
In the fourteenth century, a gothic church stood at Mariazell with a 90 m high spire and an ogive portal. In 1420 and 1474, the church was destroyed by fire. The church building was later expanded and redesigned in the Baroque style by Domenico Sciassia from 1644 to 1683. To the left and right of the gothic spire, a baroque tower was built, the nave was lengthened and widened, and a dome was added on the eastern side. The high altar, consecrated in 1704, was designed by Johann Bernhard Fischer von Erlach.

The twelve side chapels each contain a baroque altar. The plaster stucco work of the organ gallery and the 1737 organ console was created by the Viennese sculptor Johann Wagner in 1740.

In front of the main entrance are two life-sized lead statues created by Balthasar Moll in 1757. To the left stands King Ludwig I of Hungary and to the right is Heinrich, Margrave of Moravia.

In 1907, the pilgrimage church was elevated to a basilica minor.

The basilica has been undergoing a general restoration since 1992, which was completed in 2007.

=== Holy image and chapel ===
The older part of the building, built in 1690, contains the Gnadenkapelle. This chapel sits on the site of the first "cell" and holds a Late Romanesque miraculous image of the Virgin Mary - the "Magna Mater Austria", a 48 cm tall statuette made of linden. The miraculous image receives an elaborately designed merciful dress every year. The more than 150 dresses can either be viewed in the treasury or are carefully conserved. Many clothes were donated as votive offerings or by wealthy people. The design of a mercy dress is still considered a great honor today.

== Pilgrimage development ==
1836 woodcut from The Penny Magazine depicting pilgrims heading to Mariazell

Pilgrims were already making their way to the Marian sanctuary in the 12th century. Larger numbers of pilgrims are documented beginning around 1330, when a secular court imposed a Zellfahrt (Zell journey) as atonement for its criminals. In the following years increasing numbers of pilgrims came from neighboring lands. After the Counter-Reformation, the Habsburgs made Mariazell a national sanctuary. However, in 1783, Emperor Joseph II abandoned the monastery in Mariazell, and in 1787, he completely banned pilgrimages to Mariazell. The pilgrimage was reinstated under Francis I of Austria. In the 19th century, pilgrims were recorded as heading to Mariazell from Styria, Carinthia, Moravia, Silesia, the Tyrol, Vienna, and other parts of the Austrian Empire, with a formal pilgrimage beginning at St. Stephen's Cathedral, Vienna in summer. In May 2004, the Mitteleuropäischer Katholikentag (Central European Catholic Day) took place in Mariazell. Im Spring 2007, Alfred Gusenbauer, the then-Chancellor of Austria, made the Mariazell pilgrimage as part of a campaign promise. Pope Benedict XVI awarded the Golden Rose, a papal honor, to Mariazell Basilica during his apostolic journey to Austria in 2007.

== Legends ==
There are three basic legends about the founding of Mariazell and its development. The legend of the town's founding says that in 1157, a monk of St. Lambrecht, called Magnus, was sent to the area of the current town as a minister. When his way was blocked by a rock, he set down the Marian figurine he had brought with him, whereby the rock broke apart and left Magnus' way clear. On a nearby bank, he settled down, placed the figurine on a tree trunk, and built a cell out of wood, which served as both his chapel and his living quarters.

The second legend relates how Henry Margrave of Moravia and his wife, having been healed of severe gout by the help of Our Lady of Mariazell, made a pilgrimage to that place around 1200. There they had the first stone church built on the site of the wooden chapel.

The third legend recounts a victorious battle of the Hungarian King Ludwig I. over a numerically superior Turkish army. In thanks he built the gothic church and endowed it with the Schatzkammerbild (treasury image) that he saw laid upon his chest in a dream.

In 2007, the Mariazell Basilica was selected as the main motif of a collectors' coin: the Austrian Mariazell Basilica commemorative coin, minted on May 9. The coin shows the facade of the basilica with its characteristic central gothic tower flanked by two baroque towers.

== Gallery ==
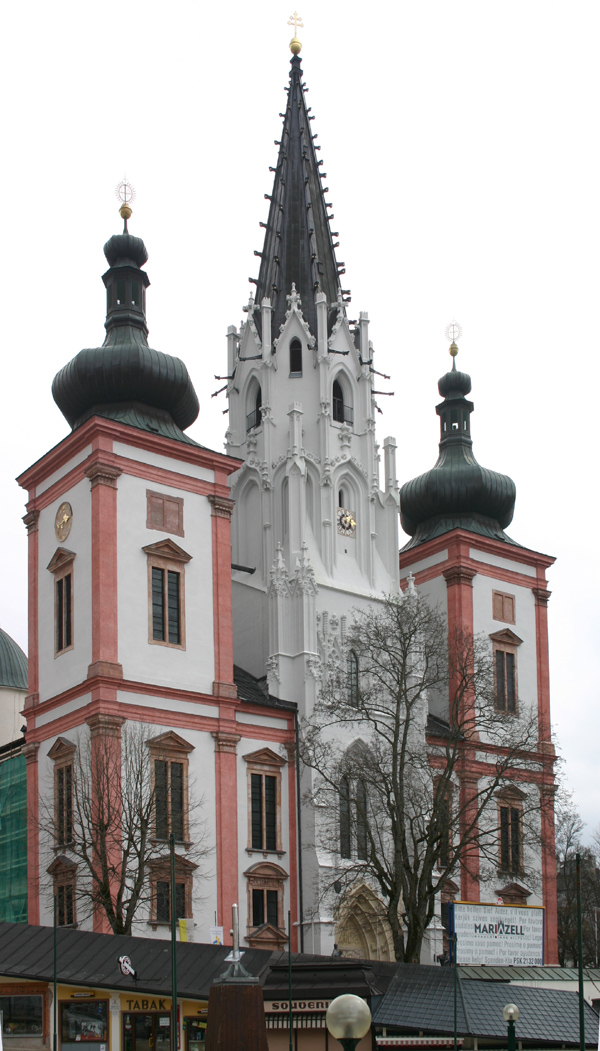
Basilica Mariä Geburt, Mariazell

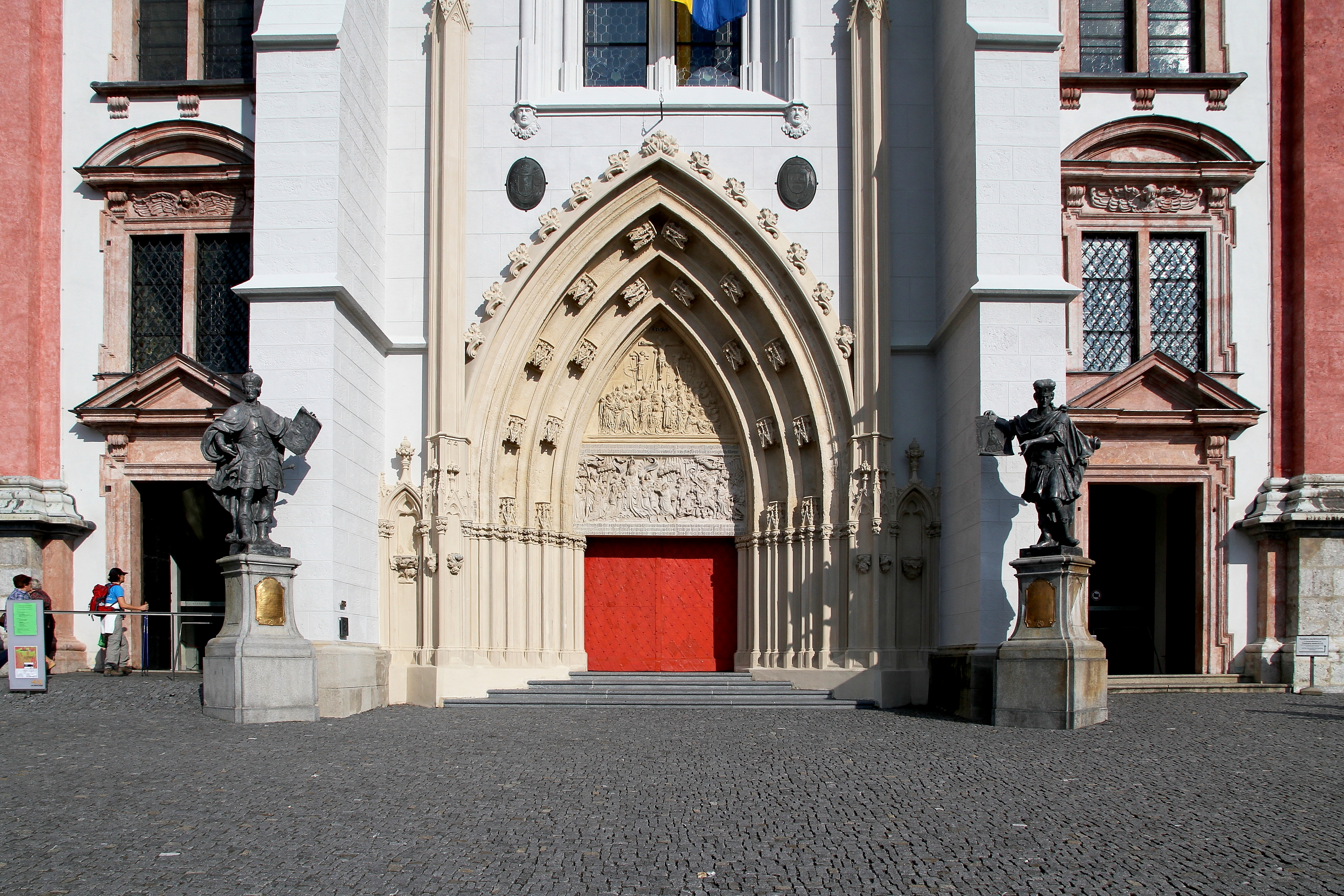
Gothic Portal

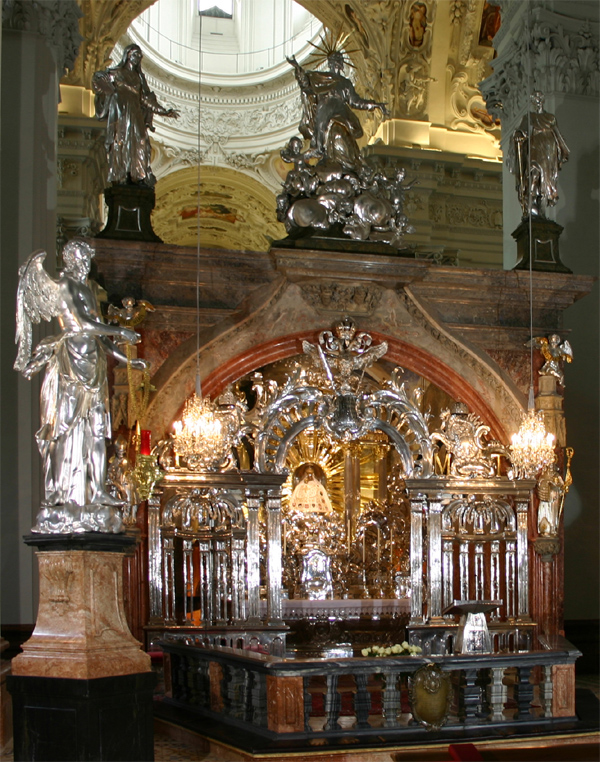
Gnadenkapelle

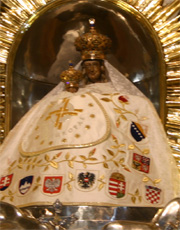
Magna Mater Austriae

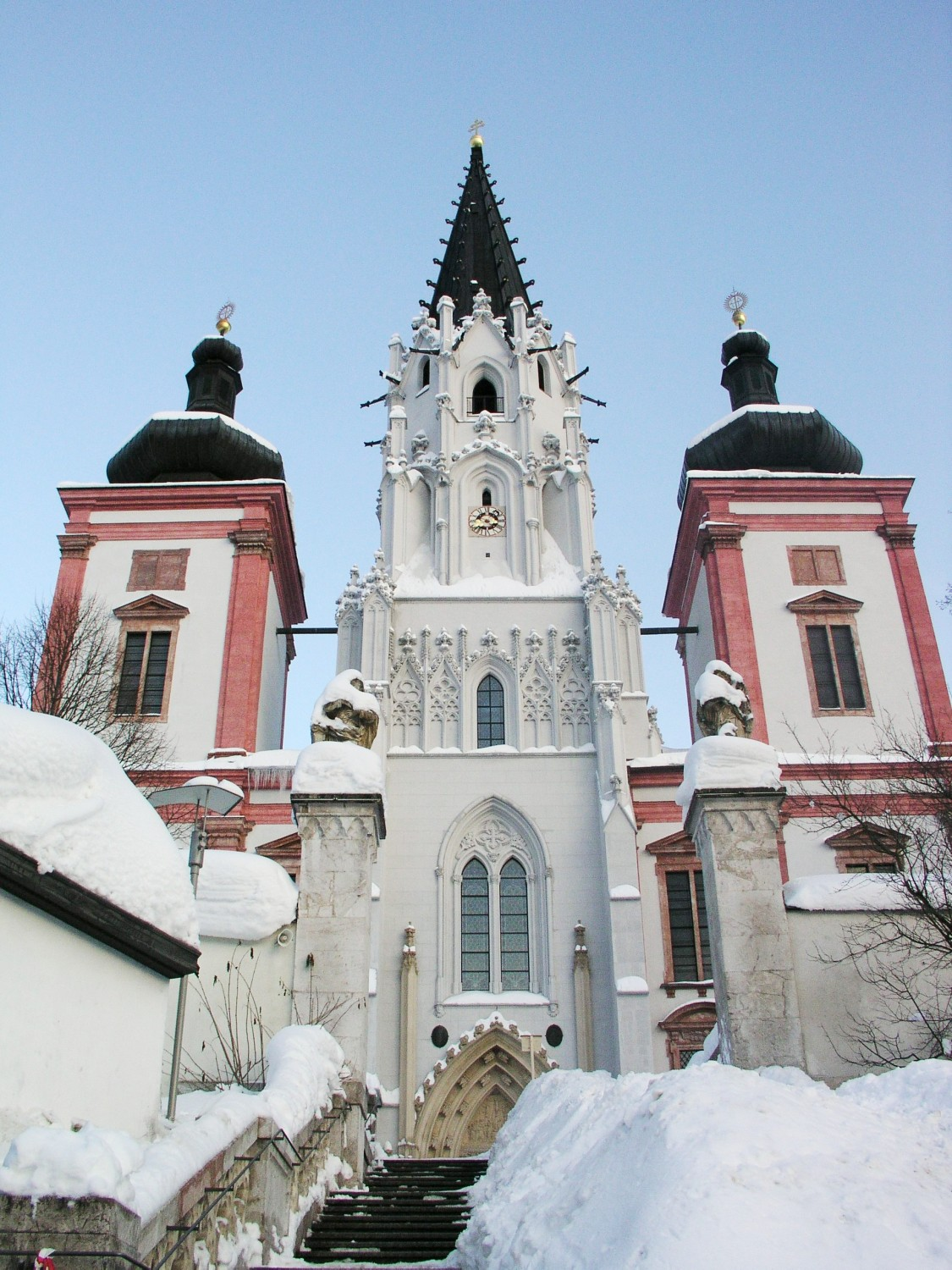
Mariazell Basilica

Mariazell Basilica commemorative coin

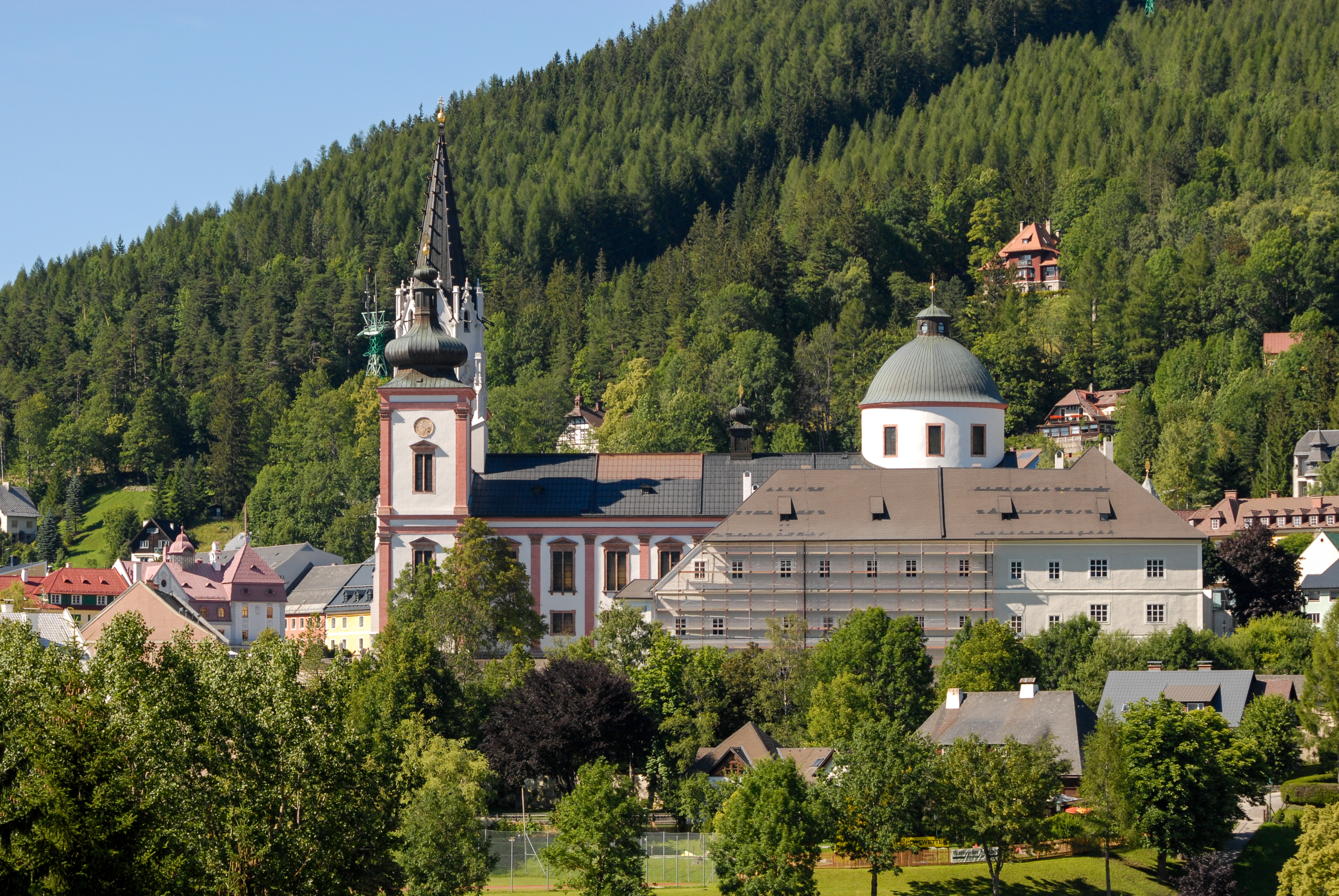
Mariazell Basilica

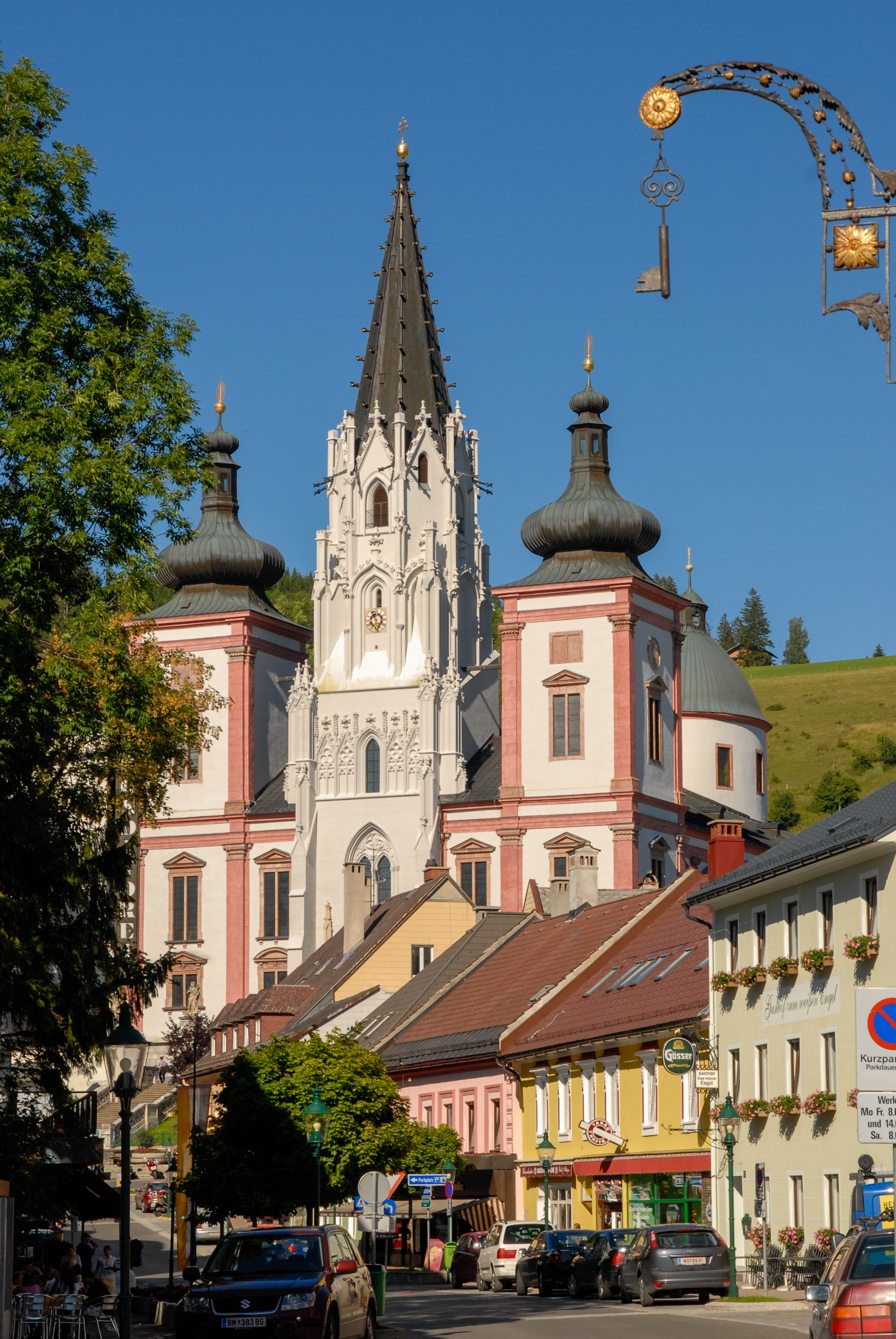
Mariazell Basilica

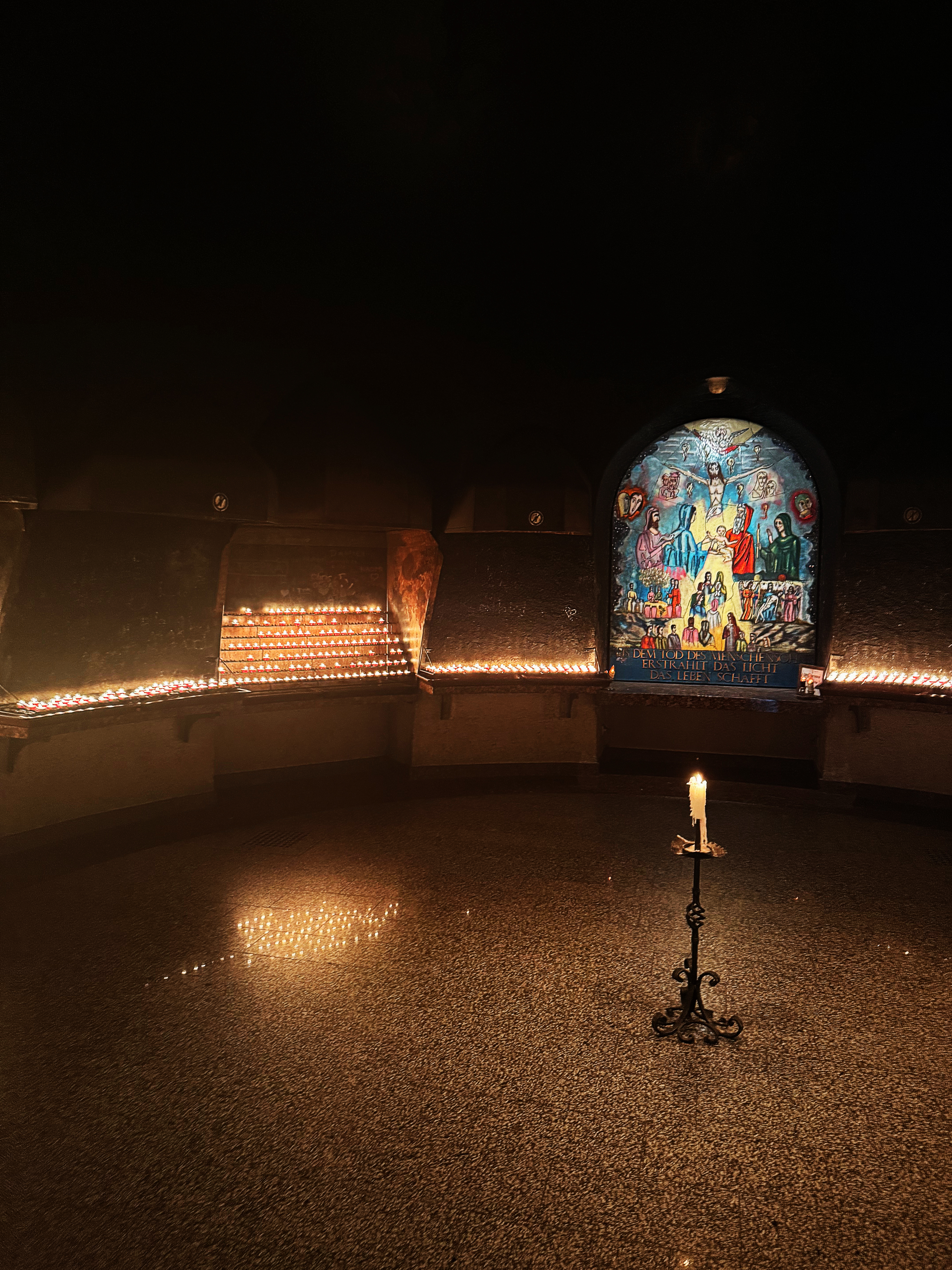
Candle grotto

== See also ==
- Tregist village chapel
- Roman Catholic Marian churches
