= Étienne Heudelet de Bierre =

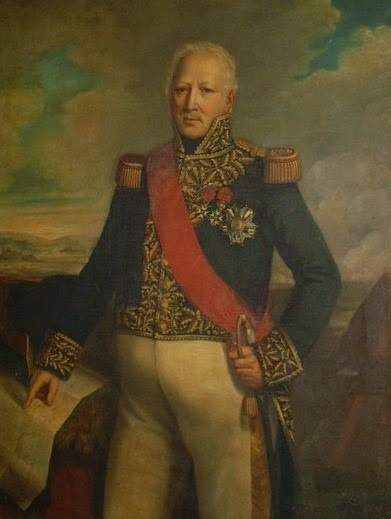
- General of Division Étienne Heudelet de Bierre
- Born: 12 November 1770
- Died: 20 April 1857 (aged 86)
- Military career
- Allegiance: France
- Branch: Staff, Infantry
- Rank: General of Division
- Conflicts: French Revolutionary Wars; Siege of Kehl; First Battle of Zurich; Second Battle of Zurich; Battle of Hohenlinden; Napoleonic Wars; Battle of Mariazell; Battle of Austerlitz; Battle of Jena; Battle of Kołoząb; Battle of Golymin; Battle of Eylau; First Battle of Porto; Battle of Bussaco; Siege of Danzig
- Awards: Légion d'Honneur, CC 1804; Légion d'Honneur, GC 1836
- Other work: Count of the Empire, 1808

Étienne Heudelet de Bierre (French: [etjɛn ødəlɛ də bjɛʁ]; 12 November 1770 – 20 April 1857) joined the French army as a volunteer lieutenant in 1792. A year later he became a staff officer for a number of generals before becoming Laurent Gouvion Saint-Cyr's chief of staff in 1795. He fought under Jean Victor Marie Moreau in the 1796 campaign and fought at Kehl. He became a general officer in 1799, leading his troops at the First and Second battles of Zurich. In April 1800 he was a brigade commander in Jean Victor Tharreau's division in Moreau's army. In December of that year he fought at Hohenlinden under Michel Ney.

In the 1805 campaign, Heudelet distinguished himself at Mariazell and Austerlitz while leading a III Corps brigade. Appointed general of division in December 1805, he was put in command of a VII Corps division in May 1806. In the War of the Fourth Coalition led his division at Jena, Kołoząb, Golymin, and Eylau. October 1808 found him in command of a VIII Corps division in Spain. His unit was soon transferred to the II Corps and fought in Nicolas Soult's invasion of Portugal at Oporto in 1809. Heudelet briefly led II Corps in January 1810 before returning to the command of his division. He participated in André Masséna's invasion of Portugal, fighting at Bussaco in 1810. His division was not engaged at Fuentes de Oñoro and he was sent home soon afterward. In the 1812 campaign he commanded a reserve division in the X Corps. At the end of the lengthy Siege of Danzig he became an Allied prisoner in November 1813.

After first submitting to King Louis XVIII, Heudelet rejoined Napoleon during the Hundred Days and led a division on the Rhine front. After Waterloo he was placed on the inactive list and retired from the army in 1819. Restored to favor after the July Revolution of 1830, he became an inspector general of infantry until 1835 when he again went on the inactive list. He died in 1857. HEUDELET is one of the names inscribed under the Arc de Triomphe, on Column 17.
