= Mariazell =

Mariazell Mariazöö
- Municipality
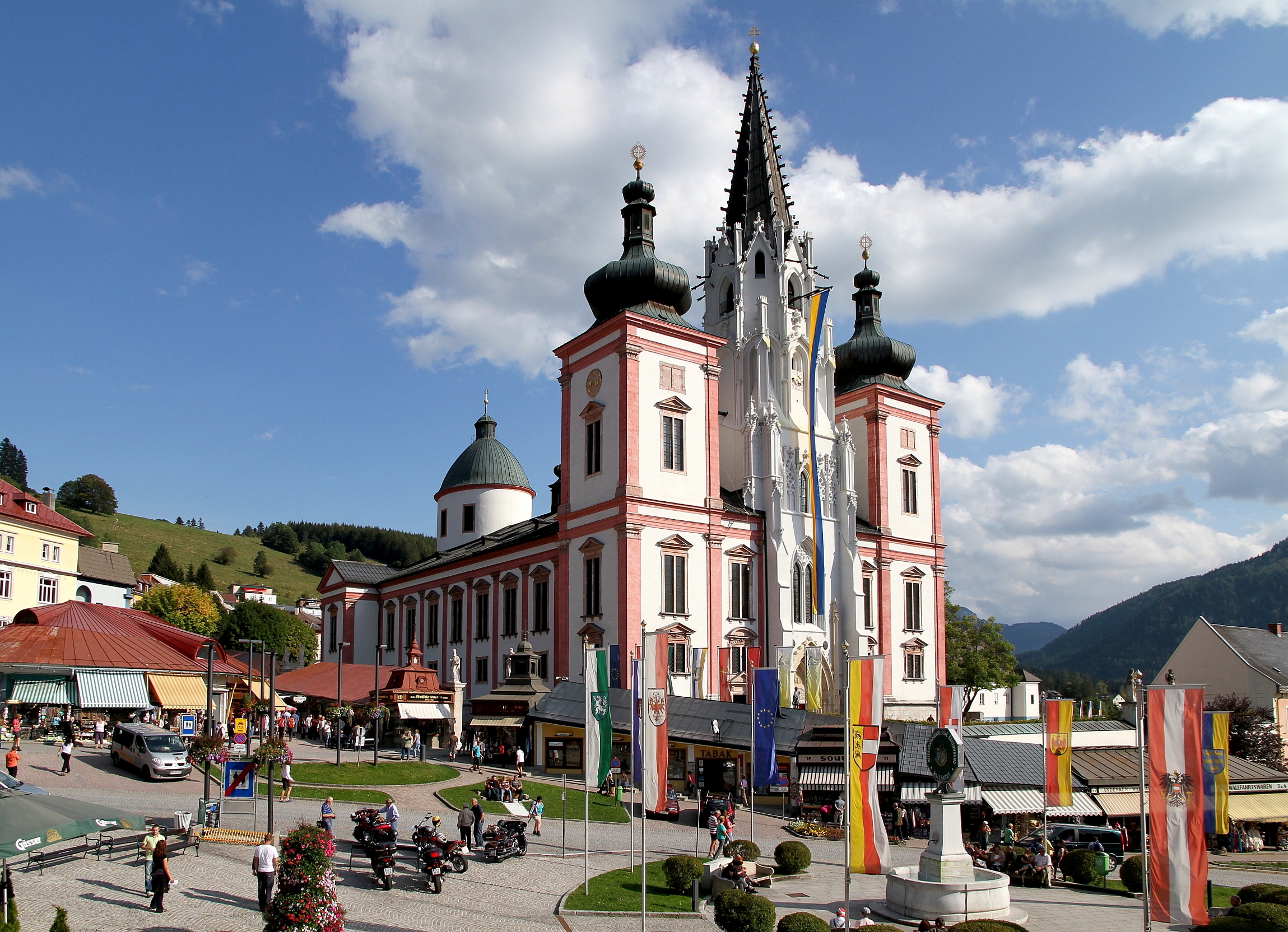
- The Mariazell Basilica

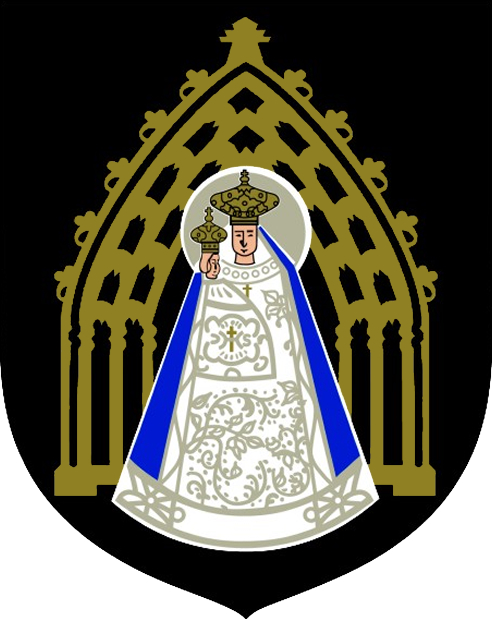
- Coat of arms

- Location within Austria
- Coordinates: 47°46′23″N 15°18′59″E
- Country: Austria
- State: Styria
- District: Bruck-Mürzzuschlag

Government
  - Mayor: Walter Schweighofer (ÖVP)

Area
  - Total: 414.09 km^{2} (159.88 sq mi)
- Elevation: 868 m (2,848 ft)

Population (2018-01-01)
  - Total: 3,813
  - Density: 9.208/km^{2} (23.85/sq mi)
- Time zone: UTC+1 (CET)
  - Summer (DST): UTC+2 (CEST)
- Postal code: 8630
- Area code: 03882
- Vehicle registration: BM
- Website: www.stadt-mariazell.at

Mariazell (German pronunciation: [ˌmaʁiːaˈtsɛl]; Central Bavarian: Mariazöö) is an Austrian city in the southeastern state of Styria. Well known for being a hub of winter sports and a pilgrimage destination, it is located 143 kilometres (89 miles) north of Graz. It is picturesquely situated in the valley of the Salza, amid the north Styrian Alps.

It is a site of pilgrimage for Catholics from Austria and neighboring countries. The object of veneration is an image of the Virgin Mary reputed to work miracles, carved in lime-tree wood. This was brought to the place in 1157, and is now enshrined in a chapel adorned with objects of silver and other costly materials. The large church of which the chapel forms part was erected in 1644 as an expansion of a smaller church built by Louis I, King of Hungary, after a victory over the Ottoman Empire in 1363.

== History ==
There is no trace of large or enclosed settlements in the area of modern Mariazell dating from pre-Christian times or the first century AD. The large number of Illyrian and Celtic mountain and river names in the region, such as for example the Erlauf, however, suggest small settlements by these tribes. The salt springs in Halltal were not unknown to these groups.

By AD 16 the Romans were using the salt roads of Halltal and the Traisental. According to some accounts, there also was a Roman road going to Neuhaus.

In 600 the Slavs, under the leadership of the Avars, took control of the land and settled in the mountain region and began farming. The expansion of these peoples also accounts for the existence of some of the town and mountain names today.

In 1025, Emperor Conrad II gave his sister-in-law Beatrix, married to Adalbero of Eppenstein, parts of the county in the Mürztale as a gift. With this gift came around 100 Huben, which belonged to the territory of the future market of Mariazell. There was an argument for one year over this gift involving the Reichsgericht and even the Pope. Eberhard, Archbishop of Salzburg, decided in 1151 in favor of the Monastery of St. Lambrecht. It was allowed to control part of the parish territory of Mariazell and of the dominion of Aflenz. The date, December 21, 1157, is taken off a document from Pope Adrian IV, still traditionally celebrated as the date of Mariazell's establishment, even though it cannot be proven historically.

In 1157, Monk Magnus came into the Zellertal with a lime-tree wood statue of the Virgin Mary and founded the first chapel there, around which the town later grew. The town's name derived from the description "Mary in the cell", i.e. in the monk's chapel.

In 1344, Mariazell was elevated to the status of market town.

Between 1340 and 1380, the church was rebuilt in the Gothic style.

In 1420, the Turks of the Ottoman Empire invaded Mariazell for the first time and burned the church and the town.

In 1474, another fire devastated the town.

In 1532, the Turks returned to Mariazell and set more houses on fire.

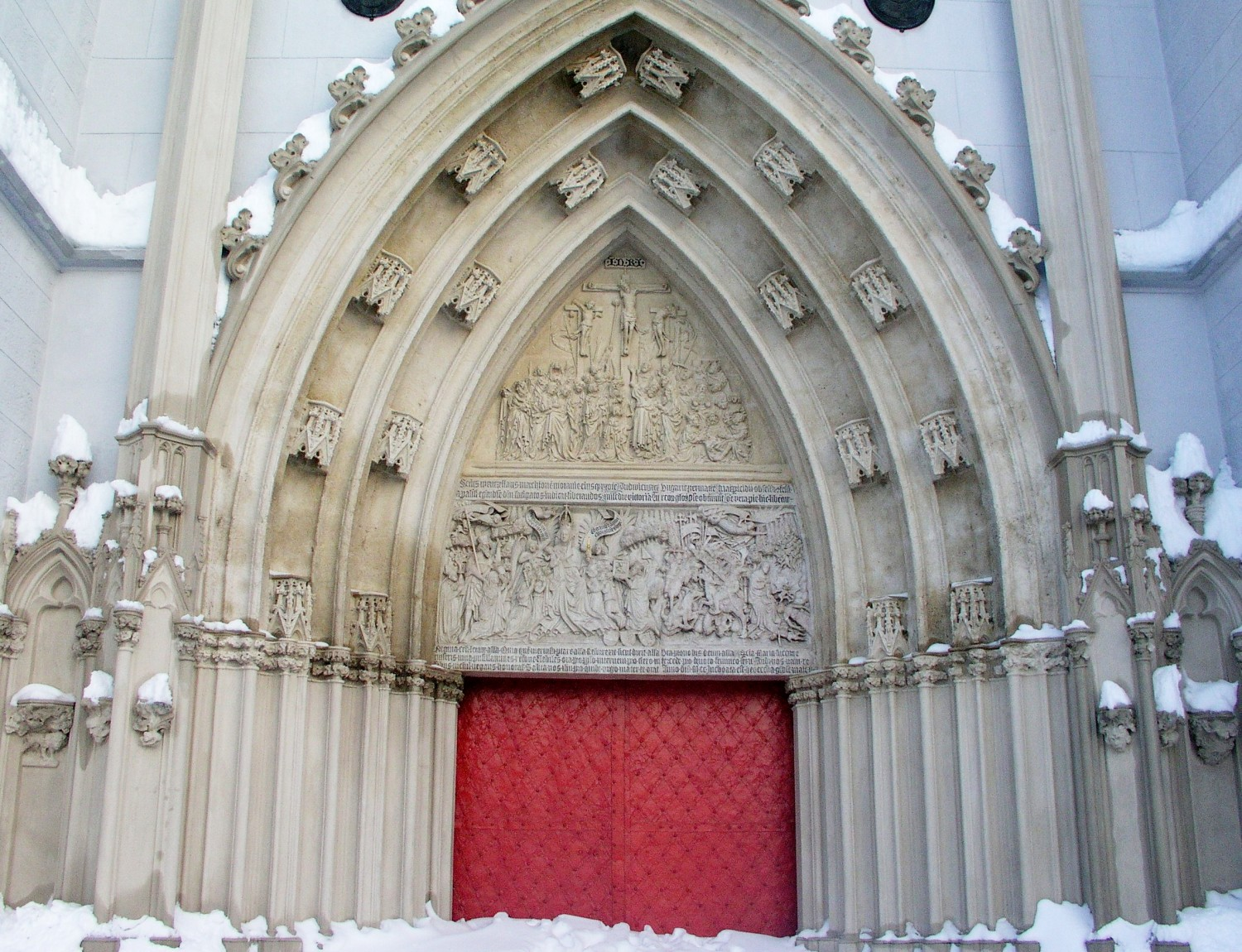
Gothic Portal

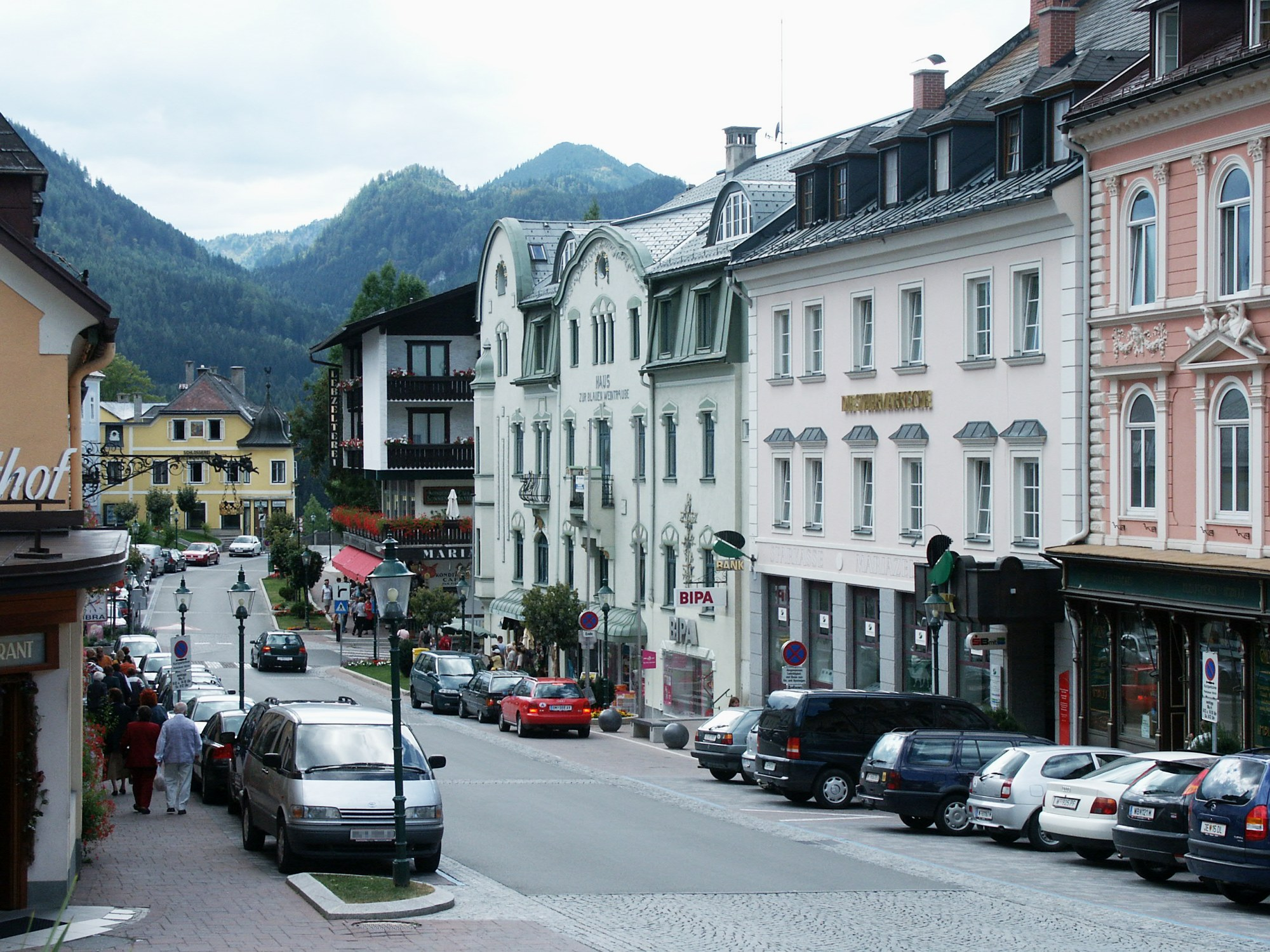
The Grazerstraße

1644: The "baroque-ization" of the church is begun by Abbot Benedikt Pierin, and the commission is given to Master Builder Sciassia. After his death the construction was continued by various other workers before being completed in 1780.

1679: Emperor Leopold I visited the shrine, and a valet in his entourage brought the plague to Mariazell. Fear and terror took hold as 156 townspeople fell victim to the disease.

1683: Fears arising from yet another Ottoman invasion caused the holy statue as well as the treasury images to be sent to St. Lambrecht, from which they were returned later that year.

1742: Empress Maria Theresa granted Abbot Eugen Inzaghi the privileges of an Archabbot over Gollrad and Aschbach, as well as over the Mariazell cast iron works.

In 1782, Joseph Haydn wrote the Mariazell Mass, for pilgrims to the Basilica in Mariazell. The mass was commissioned at the request of the pilgrims, through a military officer.

In 1786, Emperor Joseph II dissolves the Monastery of St. Lambrecht, from which Mariazell was serviced, in the course of his cloister abolishments. The pilgrimages are hampered and later completely forbidden.

In 1798, a conflagration destroyed the town; the area of Wiener Straße was especially hard hit.

1805: The Battle of Mariazell is fought in the area during the War of the Third Coalition as the French invade Austria.

1809: Faced with a French advance in the War of the Fifth Coalition, church treasures are brought to Temesvár in Hungary for security. A few weeks later, the French arrive at Mariazell. Combat operations, requisition, and crop failures lead in these years to a massive decrease in population.

1816: A great famine takes place. Archduke Johann introduces the potato and plants it in the poor fields of the area to combat hunger.

1818: Archduke Johann buys the Brandhof.

1827: Mariazell's largest fire, which incinerates almost the entire town, and leaves the church with great fire damage, occurs on All Souls' Night.

1828 - 1832: The town is rebuilt with great hardship and suffering.

1892: The idle boring machine of the cast-iron factory is converted to a power plant; the following year, Mariazell gets electric power for the first time.

1896: The building of the first public water service begins.

1898: The Mariazell cast iron factory is shut down.

1907: The Mariazellerbahn, finished the previous year, is opened for public transport. That same year, the Mariazell Basilica is elevated to a Basilica Minor.

1911: The Mariazellerbahn becomes electric.

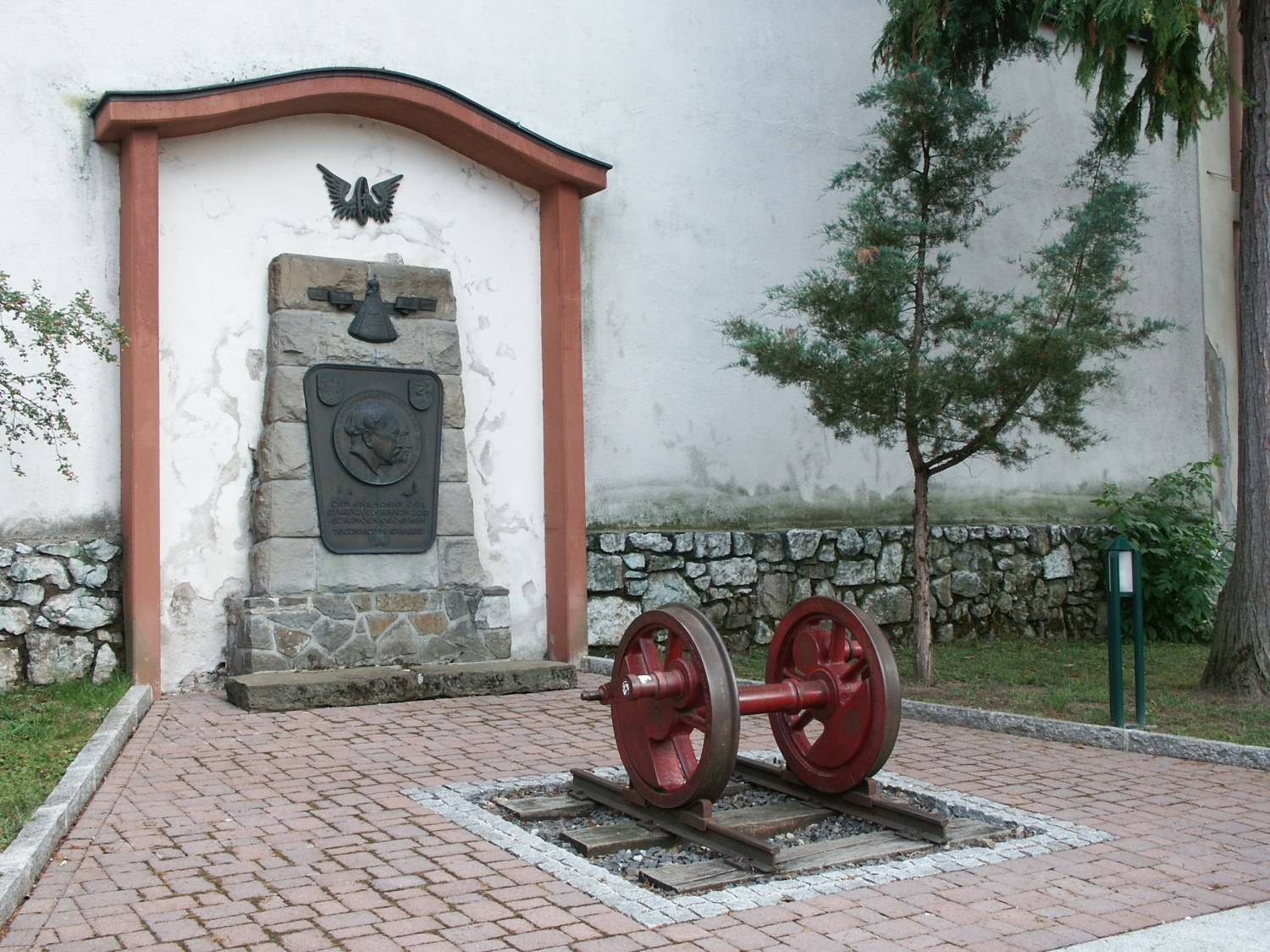
Monument to the builders of the Mariazellerbahn

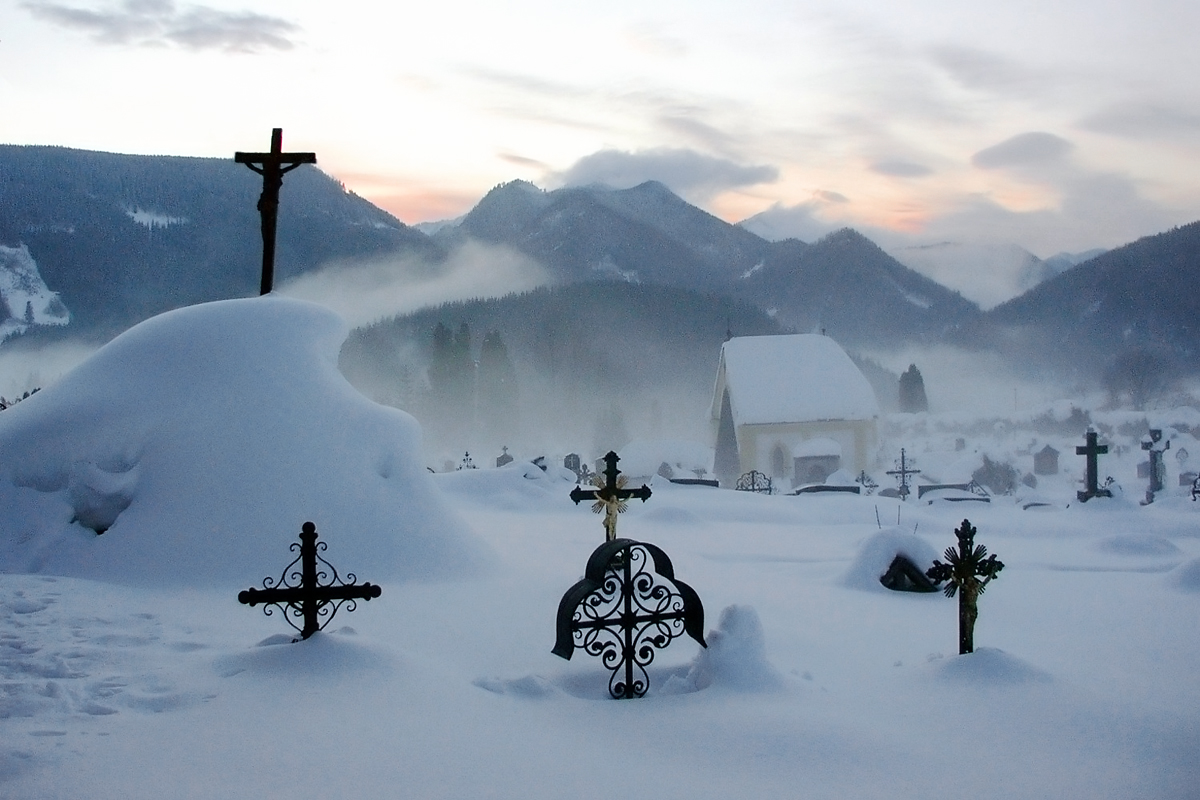
The cemetery in deep snow

1924: The first festival in the newly built festival theatre is begun.

1925: The festivals reach their high point. In the following years, financial decline brings them to an end.

1928: A gondola to the Bürger Alps becomes the first funicular to be built in Austria. That same year, the water system in expanded around the "Student-Quelle".

1945: The Red Army enters Mariazell and takes accommodations for 5,000 men.

1948: Mariazell is elevated to the status of a city.

1955 - 1957: A general restoration of the church takes place. During these years, a by-pass and a new post office are built.

1966: The fathers of the Kremsmünster Monastery separate from the fathers of the Schottenstift, who had been in charge of the ecclesiastical leadership of Mariazell since 1949. In the following years, extensive restoration work is done on the church, the priory, and the nearby chapel. The new rosary path is also built during this time.

1976: Mariazell gains an indoor swimming pool and, a few years later, the enlargement of its Hauptschule.

1983: Pope John Paul II visits Mariazell. The papal altar is built in the main plaza. In the course of this great event, the entire city receives a façade facelift, the main plaza is redesigned, and parks are created.

1990: Thanksgiving and freedom pilgrimages from the former Eastern Bloc states bring 25,000 participants to Mariazell.

1992: The Bendictines of Kremsmünster transfer the duty of pastoral care for the pilgrimages into the custody of the founding monastery and mother cloister of St. Lambrecht.

2004: Central European Catholic Day - a pilgrimage of the people to Mariazell brings over 100,000 visitors.

2007: Pope Benedict XVI visits Mariazell to celebrate the 850th anniversary of the foundation of the Shrine of Mariazell.

== Politics ==
=== Municipal council ===
The municipal council has 21 members; the 2020 elections returned:

- 13 ÖVP
- 7 SPÖ
- 1 Freie Heimatliste Mariazellerland

=== City council ===
The city council consists of the following members:

- Walter Schweighofer (ÖVP) – Mayor
- Helmut Schweiger (ÖVP) - Vice-Mayor
- Johann Kleinhofer (SPÖ) - Vice-Mayor
- Jürgen Ebner (ÖVP) - Financial Officer
- Fabian Fluch (SPÖ) - City Councillor

=== Coat of arms ===
The city coat of arms shows a black shield with a stylized depiction of the Gothic archway of the Mariazell Basilica in gold. Before it stands the gold-crowned Mariazeller Madonna with a similarly crowned Christ Child on her right arm. The Madonna wears a blue cloak and is wrapped in a silver-white robe, as is the Christ Child. The chests of both figures are adorned with a small cross.

== Culture and landmarks ==
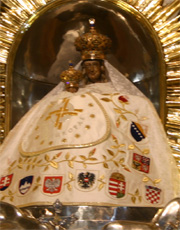
Holy image of Magna Mater Austriae

Most notable about the Mariazell Basilica, built in the 14th and 15th centuries but with a baroque interior, are the three towers on its western front. The church houses the Magna Mater Austriae ("Great Mother of Austria") in its so-called Gnadenkapelle (“Grace Chapel”). The holy image is a small wooden Marian statue from the 13th century, which plays a great role in the popular devotions of many Austrian Catholics.

== Transport ==
Mariazell lies on the highway B 20, which goes from St. Pölten over the Seebergsattel to Kapfenberg in the Mürz Valley. There is a connection through the Salza Valley to the east either over the Gscheid to St. Aegyd am Neuwalde, into the Piesting Valley und then further into the Viennese Basin (B 21) or over the Lahnsattel into the Mürz Valley and onward to Mürzzuschlag (B 23).

Mariazell is also the southern endpoint of the Mariazell railway line, a narrow gauge electric railway from St Pölten. However the terminus of the line at Mariazell station lies around 1 km (0.6 mi) north of the city center in the municipal territory of Sankt Sebastian. The station is also the terminus of the Museumstramway Mariazell-Erlaufsee, a standard gauge heritage steam tramway that operates to the nearby Erlaufsee.

Mariazell Airport is a private use airport that is located 2 kilometres (1 mi) north-northwest of Mariazell.

== International relations ==
=== Twin towns – Sister cities ===
Mariazell is twinned with:

- Esztergom in Hungary (since May 6, 2002)
- Loreto in Italy
