= Giuseppe de Rossi (composer) =

Italian composer and choir conductor (died 1719/1720)

Giuseppe de Rossi was an Italian composer and choir conductor from Rome. He was born sometime during the mid-17th century, and died in either 1719 or 1720. Is likely that he was trained as a musician under Orazio Benevoli. He was the maestro di cappella at first the Castel Sant'Angelo in Rome, and then the Basilica della Santa Casa in Loreto; holding the position at the latter institution from 1701 through 1711. He succeeded G.P. Franchi as maestro di cappella at the Santa Maria ai Monti in July 1711, where he remained until his death.

Rossi wrote only sacred music is best known for writing choral music; in particular, masses. His compositional style is reminiscent of Orazio Benevoli, whose polychoral style Rossi emulated. Some of his masses utilize text from sermons written by Augustine of Hippo.
