= Mariazell Airport =

Mariazell Airport Flugplatz Mariazell
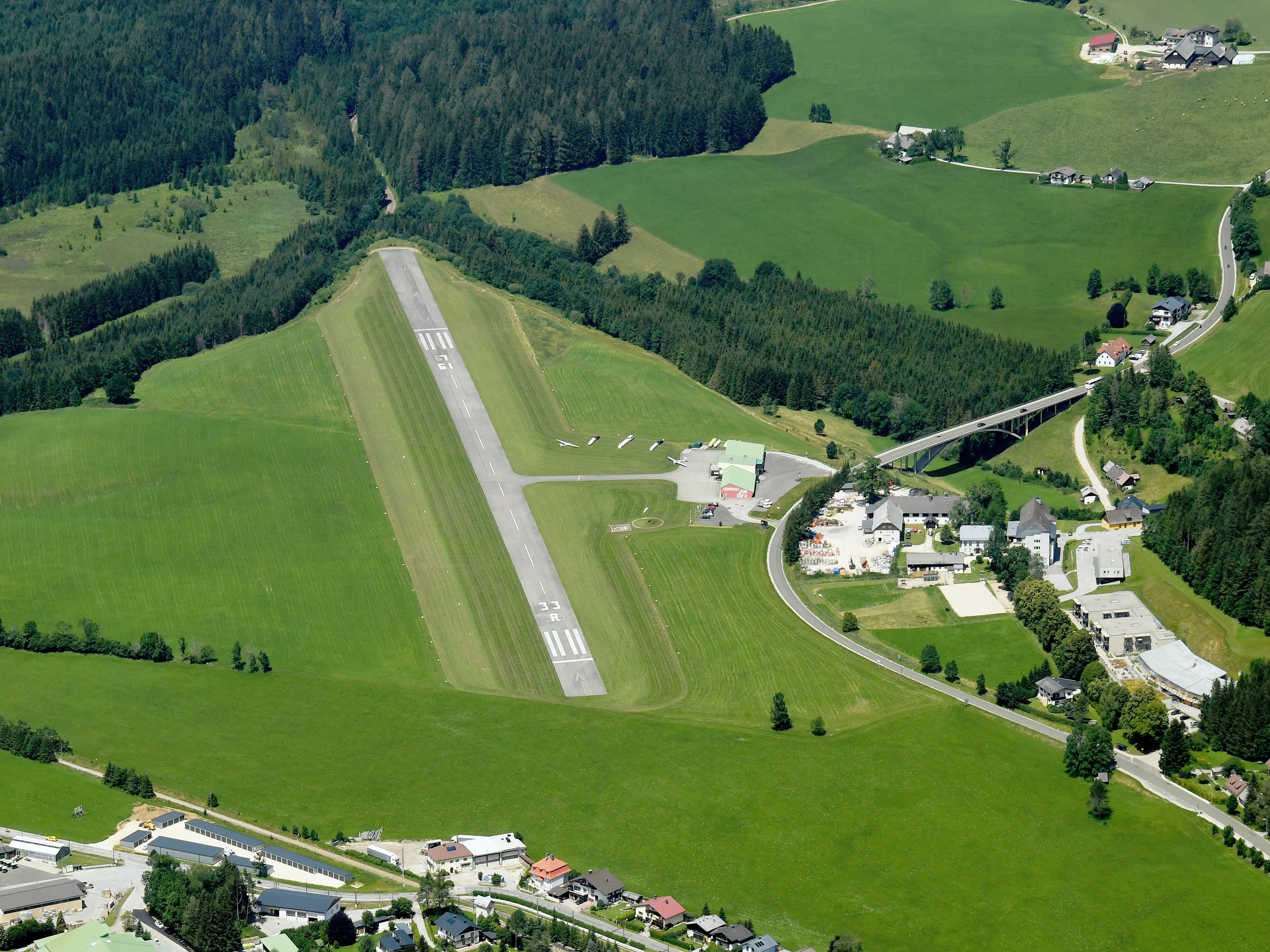
- IATA: none; ICAO: LOGM

Summary
- Airport type: Private
- Serves: Mariazell
- Location: Austria
- Elevation AMSL: 2,828 ft / 862 m
- Coordinates: 47°47′23.4″N 015°18′0.7″E

Map
- Location of Mariazell Airport in Austria

Runways
Direction	Length		Surface
Direction	ft	m	Surface
15/33	2,270	692	Asphalt
15L/33R	1,800	549	Grass
- Source: Landings.com

Mariazell Airport (German: Flugplatz Mariazell, ICAO: LOGM) is a private use airport located 2 kilometres (1 mi) north-northwest of Mariazell, Steiermark, Austria.

== See also ==
- List of airports in Austria
