= Girolamo Lombardo =

Italian sculptor

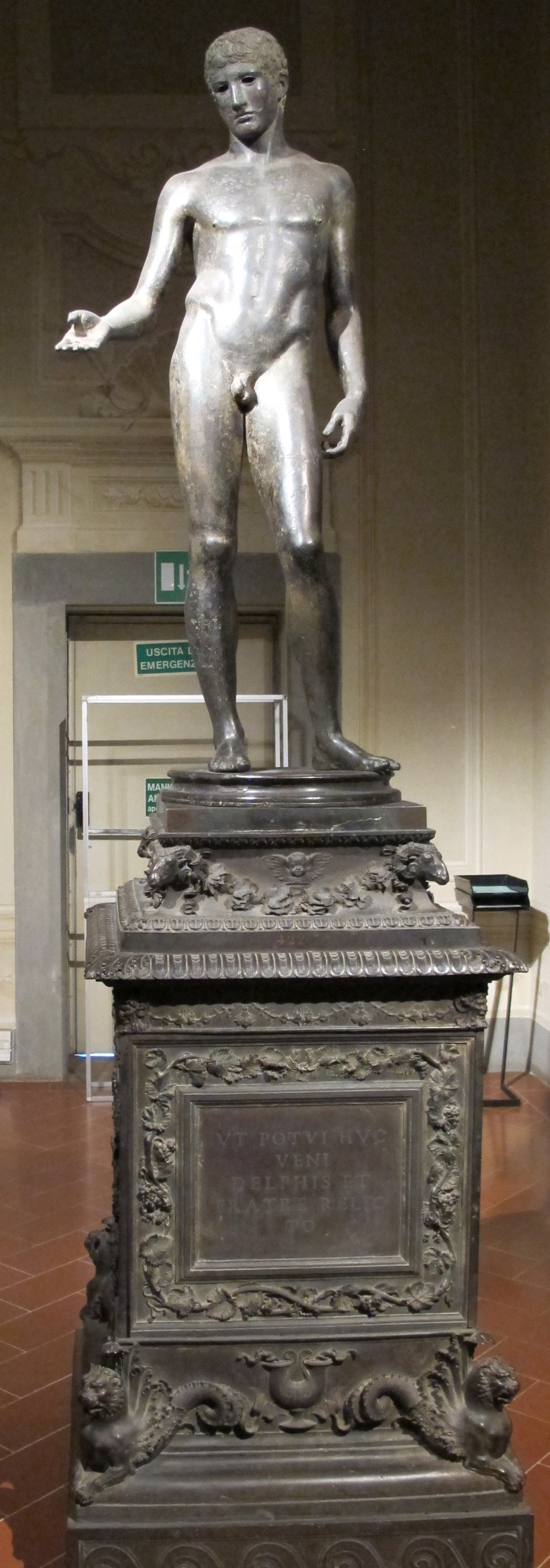
Idolino di Pesaro, base by Girolamo Lombardo, Uffizi

Girolamo Lombardo, also Girolamo Lombardi (1506–1590), was an Italian sculptor.

== Life ==
Lombardo was born in Ferrara, the son of the architect and sculptor Antonio Lombardo, and also was the brother of Lodovico and Aurelio, also sculptors. He studied and began in his father's workshop in Ferrara, then subsequently traveled to Venice to continue training with Jacopo Sansovino, with which, between 1532 and 1540, he worked in the Biblioteca Marciana in the Loggia of the bell tower of Saint Mark's in Venice.

Lombardo is documented in Loreto, Marche since 1543, where for some years he was active with his brother Aurelio and where they were in 1550 also reached the third brother, Lodovico. Around 1552 he moved with his brothers and opened their own foundry and workshop in Recanati, passing the Venetian mature technique to all operators of the workshop. The school sculptural continued in subsequent generations with Tiburzio Vergelli, Antonio Calcagni, Sebastiano Sebastiani, Tarquinio Jacometti and Pier Paolo Jacometti.

His sons Anthony, Peter and Paul, also became sculptors and bronze founders.
