= Basilica della Santa Casa =

Church in Loreto, Marche, Italy

Coordinates: 43°26′27″N 13°36′38″E

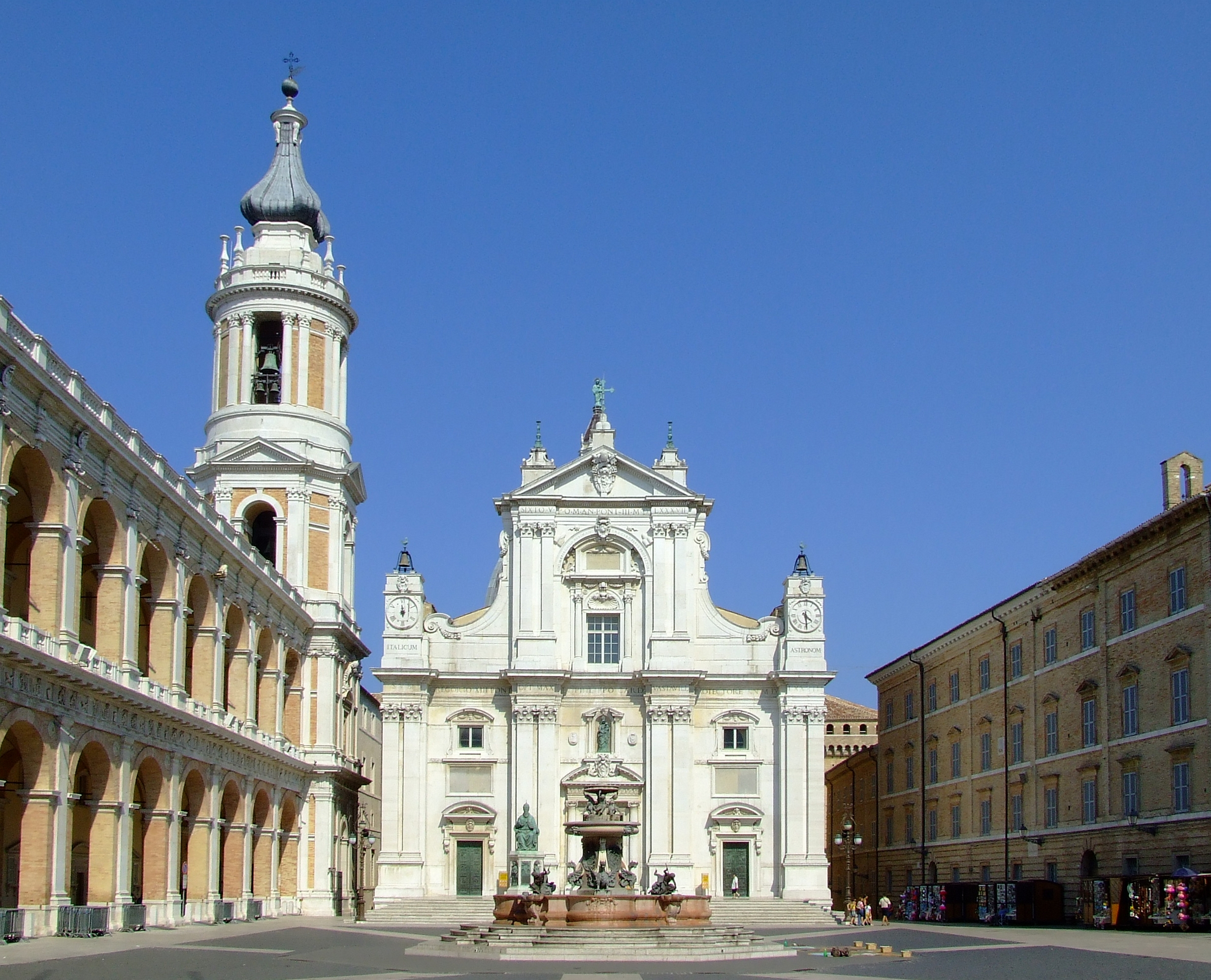
- The façade edifice of the Basilica della Santa Casa.
- Basilica della Santa Casa
- Location: Loreto, Marche, Italy
- Denomination: Catholic Church

History
- Status: Pontifical minor basilica

Architecture
- Style: Late Gothic
- Completed: 16th century

The Basilica della Santa Casa (English: Basilica of the Holy House) is a Marian shrine in Loreto, in the Marches, Italy. The shrine is widely known for preserving the house of the Holy Family. Pious legends claim the same house was supernaturally flown over by angelic beings from Nazareth to Tersatto (Trsat in Croatia), then to Recanati, before arriving at the current site. The shrine is designated a basilica by the privilege of immemorial status.

The basilica is also known for enshrining the Madonna and Child image of "Our Lady of Loreto". Pope Benedict XV designated her under this title as patroness of air passengers and auspicious travel on 24 March 1920. Pope Pius XI granted a Canonical Coronation to the venerated image made of cedar of Lebanon wood on 5 September 1922, replacing the original Marian image consumed in fire on 23 February 1921.

== The basilica ==
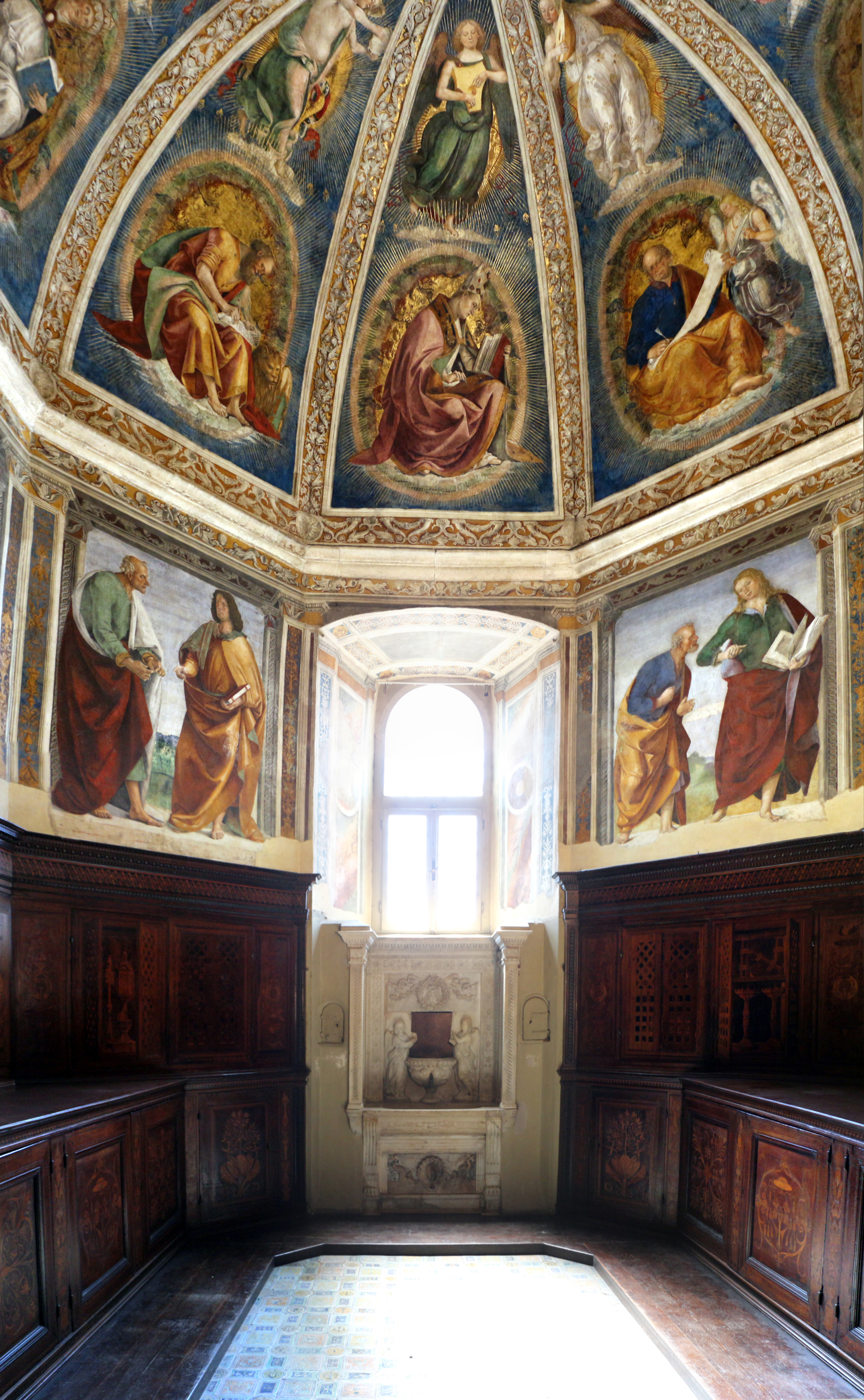
Sacristy with murals by Luca Signorelli

The basilica containing the Santa Casa is a Late Gothic structure built starting from 1468, and continued by Giuliano da Maiano, Giuliano da Sangallo, and Donato Bramante. It is 93 metres (305 ft) long, 60 m (200 ft) wide, and its campanile is 75.6 m (248 ft) high.

The façade of the church was erected under Pope Sixtus V, who fortified Loreto in 1586 and gave it the privileges of a town; his colossal statue stands on the parvis, above the front steps, a third of the way to the left as one enters. Over the principal doorway there is a lifesize bronze statue of the Virgin and Child by Girolamo Lombardo; the three superb bronze doors executed at the latter end of the 16th century under the reign of Pope Paul V (1605–1621) are also by Lombardo (1506–1590), his sons and his pupils, among them Tiburzio Vergelli (1551–1609), who also made the fine bronze font in the interior. The doors and hanging lamps are by the same artists.

The richly decorated campanile (1750 to 1754), by Luigi Vanvitelli, is of great height; the principal bell, presented by Pope Leo X in 1516, weighs 11 tons.

The interior of the church has mosaics by Domenichino and Guido Reni and other works of art, including statues by Raffaello da Montelupo. In the sacristies on each side of the right transept are frescoes, on the right by Melozzo da Forlì, on the left by Luca Signorelli and in both there are some fine intarsias; the basilica as a whole is thus a collaborative work by generations of architects and artists.

== Santa Casa ==
The main focus of Loreto is the Holy House itself (in Italian, the Santa Casa di Loreto). It has been a Catholic pilgrimage destination since at least the 14th century and a popular tourist destination as well.

=== House ===
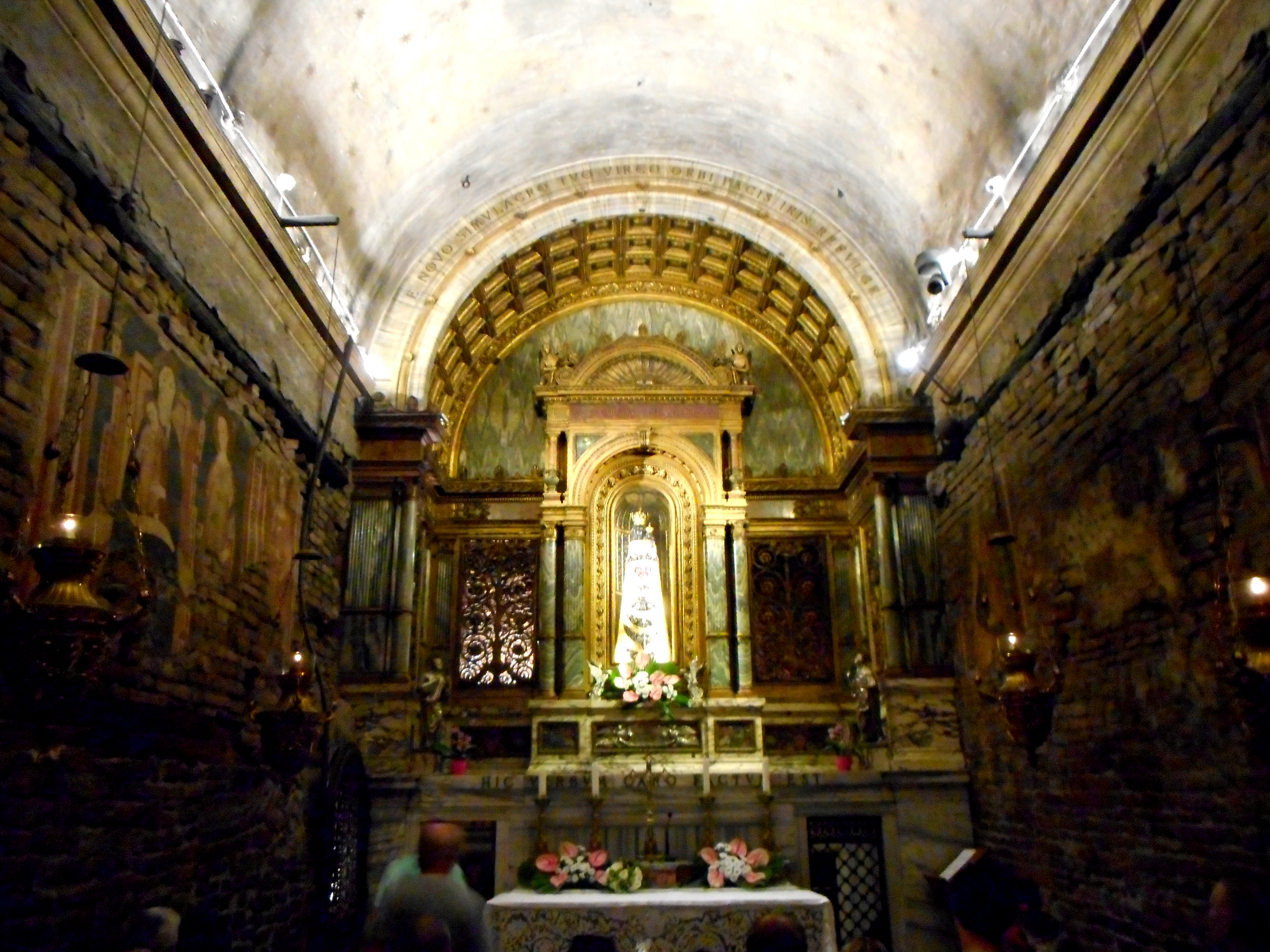
Interior view of the Holy House of Loreto, showing its plain masonry walls

The House itself consists of three stone walls. It is a plain stone structure, with a door on the north side and a window on the west. The size is 31 by 13 feet (9.4 m × 4.0 m) (or 9.52 m × 4.10 m × 4.30 m (31.2 ft × 13.5 ft × 14.1 ft)) high.

=== Black Madonna of Our Lady of Loreto ===
A niche contains a 33-inch (84 cm) high image of the Virgin and Child, richly adorned with jewels, above the altar. The statue was commissioned after a fire in the Santa Casa in 1921 destroyed the original Madonna, and it was granted a Canonical Coronation in 1922 by Pope Pius XI.

A legend attributes the original statue of olive wood to Saint Luke, but the style suggests it was created in the 15th century. The original statue, dating back to the 1400s, was an image of the Black Madonna with the Christ Child, both of whom were covered since the 16th century with a jeweled mantle or dalmatic.

The statue was stolen by Napoleonic troops in 1797 and taken to Paris. It was returned with the Treaty of Tolentino and ended up in Rome, from where the image made an eight-day journey as a pilgrim Madonna, arriving in Loreto on 9 December 1801. During the absence of the original statue from the Holy House, a copy made of poplar wood was placed in the niche and remains the only copy to have been venerated in the Holy House. This copy is now enshrined at the Chiesa della Buona Morte in Cannara.

In 1921, a fire broke out inside the Holy House which incinerated the sculpture. At the behest of Pope Pius XI, a new image similar to the original was immediately carved, using the wood of a cedar of Lebanon from the Vatican Gardens. It was modeled by Enrico Quattrini and executed and painted by Leopoldo Celani. In 1922, the statue was crowned in St. Peter's Basilica in the Vatican and transported to Loreto.

There is a local tradition in the city of Treia that the original statue of Our Lady of Loreto was hidden and replaced with a copy before Napoleon's troops looted the basilica. When the copy was returned to Loreto, the exchange with the original statue never took place. Thus, it was the copy that was destroyed by fire. The original statue was hidden in a convent and then taken by Visitandine nuns to Treia, where it is enshrined at the Church of Santa Chiara. Much like the Holy House, it is associated with miracles.

=== Sculpted marble screen ===
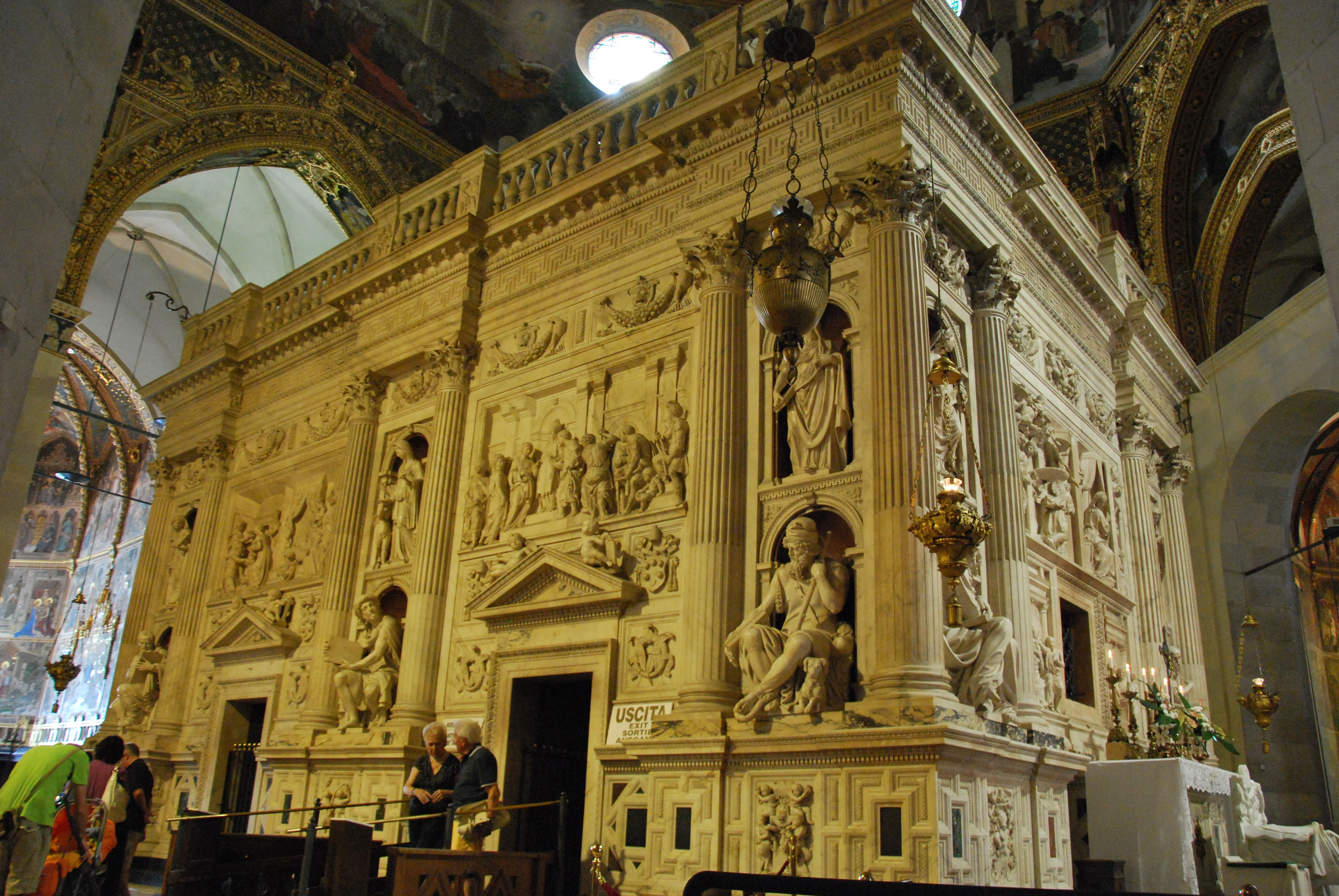
Marble screen around the Holy House

Around the house is a tall marble screen designed by Bramante and executed under Popes Leo X, Clement VII and Paul III. A small part of this sculpture was the work of Andrea Sansovino, but the greater part was executed by Raffaello da Montelupo, Tribolo and others of his assistants and pupils. The four sides represent the Annunciation, the Nativity, the Arrival of the Santa Casa at Loreto and the Nativity of the Virgin, respectively.

== Hall of the Treasury ==
The Hall of the Treasury dates from the beginning of the 17th century. It contains votive offerings, liturgical objects and vestments. The frescoes on the vaulted ceiling are exquisite examples of late Roman Mannerism and were created between 1605 and 1610 by Cristoforo Roncalli, known as Pomarancio.

== Traditional account ==
=== 1st-century Judaea ===
Late medieval religious traditions developed suggesting that this was the house in which the Holy Family (Mary, Joseph and Jesus) had lived while in Judea at the start of the first century AD. According to this narrative, this is the Nazareth house in which Mary had been born and brought up, received the Annunciation, conceived Jesus through the Holy Spirit, and had lived during the childhood of Christ. After Jesus's Ascension, the house was converted into a church where the Apostles placed an altar, at which Saint Peter celebrated the first Eucharist after the Resurrection.

=== 1291 miraculous translation to Dalmatia ===
Just before the final expulsion of the Christian Crusaders from the Holy Land, in order to protect it from Muslim soldiers, the house was miraculously carried by angels and initially deposited in 1291 on a hill at Tersatto (now Trsat, a suburb of Rijeka, Croatia), where an appearance of the Virgin and numerous miraculous cures attested to its sanctity. The miraculous translation of the house is said to have been confirmed by investigations made at Nazareth by messengers from the governor of Dalmatia.

=== 1294: miraculous translation to Italy ===
As pilgrims were prey to bandits, in 1294, angels again carried it across the Adriatic Sea to the woods near Ancona (although the reasoning is not clear as to why this happened); from these woods (Latin lauretum, Italian Colle dei Lauri or from the name of its proprietress Laureta) the chapel derived the name which it still retains (Latin sacellum gloriosæ Virginis in Laureto). The house that gave rise to the title Our Lady of Loreto, applied to the Virgin.

=== 1295–1296: three more translations ===
"By the will of God", it was afterwards moved again thrice: in 1295 to a hill near Recanati, but being too close to the sea and therefore exposed to the dangers of Turkish raids, after eight months it was again moved to a hill a mile away, Monte Prodo, near Loreto. Here two counts sought to acquire title to the land in order to profit from the pilgrimages. In 1296, the Santa Casa is moved for the fifth time to the road that goes from Recanati to Porto Recanati, and therefore not on private property.

== Historicity ==
An authority on Loreto has summed up the controversy concerning the miraculous flight of the Holy House by writing that it has attracted "the ridicule of one half of the world and the devotion of the other."

=== Archaeological pro arguments ===
A number of arguments have been made at various times for the house's authenticity. The 1913 Catholic Encyclopedia reports that the stones and mortar of the house are claimed to be typical of 1st century Nazareth and Palestine, but not of Loreto and Marche. It also cites the house's lack of foundations. Another Catholic book, from 1895, claims further that investigations in 1751 found the house to be placed directly on uncleared ground, on top of miscellaneous paving stones, shells, nuts, and bushes. Other Christian sources describe Hebrew and Greek graffiti on the walls, which they compare to writings found at the Grotto of the Annunciation in Nazareth. A sixteenth-century investigation ordered by Pope Clement VII reported that the house's measurements exactly matched those of foundations in front of the Grotto in Nazareth. Finally, apologists cite the house's placement partly on a public road, arguing that a house would not be deliberately built in such a location.

=== Earliest mentions of the house ===
The documented history of the house can only be traced as far back as the close of the Crusades, around the 14th century. An early brief reference is made in the Italia Illustrata of Flavius Blondus (1392–1463), secretary to Popes Eugene IV, Nicholas V, Calixtus III and Pius II; it can be read in its entirety in the Redemptoris mundi Matris Ecclesiæ Lauretana historia, contained in the Opera Omnia (1576) of Baptista Mantuanus.

The first detailed mention of the tradition is a 1472 leaflet by Teramano.

=== Translation by Angelos/Angeli family theory ===
In modern times, the Church traced the linguistic origins of the story to an aristocratic family called "Angelos", which were responsible for the transfer. There are 16th-century bas-reliefs, which suggest that the Holy House was transported by sea. In May 1900, papal physician Giuseppe Lapponi indicated that he had read in the Vatican archives documents suggesting that the members of the noble Byzantine family named Angelos had saved the stones of the House from Muslim devastation and transported them to Loreto. In a second step, in late 1294, Nikephoros, ruler of Epirus from the Angelos family (in Italian: Niceforo Angeli), sent on the bricks to Italy as a wedding gift for his daughter who had married Prince Philip, the son of the King of Naples, in October that year. In both Greek and Latin, the family name Angelos/Angeli means "angels". The stones considered by researchers to be authentic are still visibly marked with Roman numerals, by scratching or with coal, which suggests that the three walls were carefully taken apart with the intention to faithfully reassemble them at another location. The traditional date of the miraculous translation, 12 May 1291, is compatible with the historical dates – the port city of Acre, the Crusader capital, fell six days later, theoretically allowing for the shipment of the stones, once they had been carried by cart from Nazareth to the port of Acre.

Archaeological excavations were carried out between 1962 and 1965. Among the numerous coins found underneath the building, there were two bearing the inscription "Gui Dux Atenes". This refers to Guy II de la Roche, the Regent of Athens from 1280 to 1287. His parents were the Frankish nobleman, William I, Duke of Athens, and the Aromanian Greek princess Helena Angelina Komnene, the daughter of John Doukas, Prince of Thessaly, also known as John Angelos. Through his mother, Guy was related to the Byzantine families of the Komnenos and Doukas, Emperors of Constantinople and Epirus. Helena was Regent of the Duchy of Athens from the death of her husband in 1287 until her son's reaching the age of majority in 1294, covering the entire time span of the translation of the Holy House from Nazareth, to Epirus, to Recanati (Loreto). The presence of the two coins are proof that the Angelos family, known in Italian as Angeli and later as De Angeli, supervised the event. The law of Recanati categorically prohibited construction of any type of building on public roads, providing for its immediate demolition; only an intervention from a very high authority could have led to a suspension of the law, as is reported to have happened in the case of the House. Archaeological examination offered further proof for both the provenance of the stones from Nazareth, and for them being reassembled at Loreto, where several phases of support construction for the three-wall structure could be detected.

=== Counter-arguments: chronology and late origin ===
According to Herbert Thurston, in some respects, the Lauretan tradition is "beset with difficulties of the gravest kind", which were noted in a 1906 work on the subject.

There are documents which indicate that a church dedicated to the Blessed Virgin already existed at Loreto in the 12th and 13th centuries, at least a century before the supposed translation.

There is no mention by early pilgrims or other sources of a building at the venerated site in Nazareth, other than the rock-hewn chamber. Neither does any document from the time following the alleged transition mention any missing structure at the site.

There is also no mention of the alleged transition before 1472, 180 years after the time of the supposed translation.

==== Statue-before-house-legend theory ====
Thurston suggests that a miracle working statue or picture of the Madonna was brought from Tersatto in Illyria (more precisely Dalmatia) to Loreto by some pious Christians and was then confounded with the ancient rustic chapel in which it was harboured, the veneration formerly given to the statue afterwards passing to the building.

== Vision of Blessed Anne Catherine Emmerich ==
The Marian stigmatist, Blessed Anne Catherine Emmerich (1774–1824) explicitly claims that the house was transported by angels, even to her own near-disbelief:

I have often in vision witnessed the transporting of the Holy House to Loretto. For a long time, I could not believe it, and yet I continued to see it. I saw the Holy House borne over the sea by seven angels. It had no foundation, but there was under it a shining surface of light. On either side was something like a handle. Three angels carried it on one side and three on the other; the seventh hovered in front of it, a long train of light after him.

— Anne Catherine Emmerich

== Modern era ==
In 1797, Napoleon's troops sacked the church. The treasury was emptied, either looted by soldiers, or its contents requisitioned by the pope who needed money for the payments required by the Treaty of Tolentino, which he had signed with Napoleon. Still, by 1821 the Black Madonna had been returned from the Louvre via Rome, and the treasury was again filled with valuable offerings.

== Papal support ==
Papal support of the Loreto tradition comes relatively late. The first Bull mentioning the translation is that of Julius II in 1507, and is a rather guarded expression. Julius introduces the clause "ut pie creditur et fama est", "as is piously believed and reported to be".

On 4 October 2012, Benedict XVI visited the Shrine to mark the 50th anniversary of John XXIII's visit. In his visit, Benedict formally entrusted the World Synod of Bishops and the Year of Faith to the Virgin of Loreto.

On 20 June 2020, during the Feast of the Immaculate Heart of Mary, Pope Francis added three invocations to the Litany of Loreto: Mother of mercy, Mother of hope, and Solace of migrants. He later approved the extension of the Jubilee Year of Loreto to 2021. The jubilee year marks the 100th anniversary of the official proclamation of Our Lady of Loreto as the patroness of pilots and air passengers. It began 8 December 2019 and was due to end 10 December 2020, the feast of Our Lady of Loreto, but was extended to 10 December 2021 because of disruptions due to the COVID-19 pandemic.

== Similar traditions ==
=== Nazareth ===
A competing tradition holds that the location of the Annunciation was at or near the site of the present Basilica of the Annunciation, whose lower level holds the Grotto of the Annunciation, said to be the remains of Mary's childhood home. (The Church of Saint Anne in Jerusalem is also said to have been built on the site of Mary's childhood home.) Some proponents of Loreto maintain that the Holy House and the Grotto were originally part of the same dwelling.

=== Walsingham, England ===
The shrine at Walsingham is the principal shrine of the Blessed Virgin in England. The legend of "Our Lady's house" (written down about 1465, and consequently earlier than the Loreto translation tradition) supposes that in the time of St. Edward the Confessor a chapel was built at Walsingham, which exactly reproduced the dimensions of the Holy House of Nazareth. When the carpenters could not complete it upon the site that had been chosen, it was moved and erected by angels' hands at a spot two hundred feet away.

== Veneration ==
Our Lady of Loreto is the title of the Virgin Mary with respect to the Holy House of Loreto and the image displayed therein.

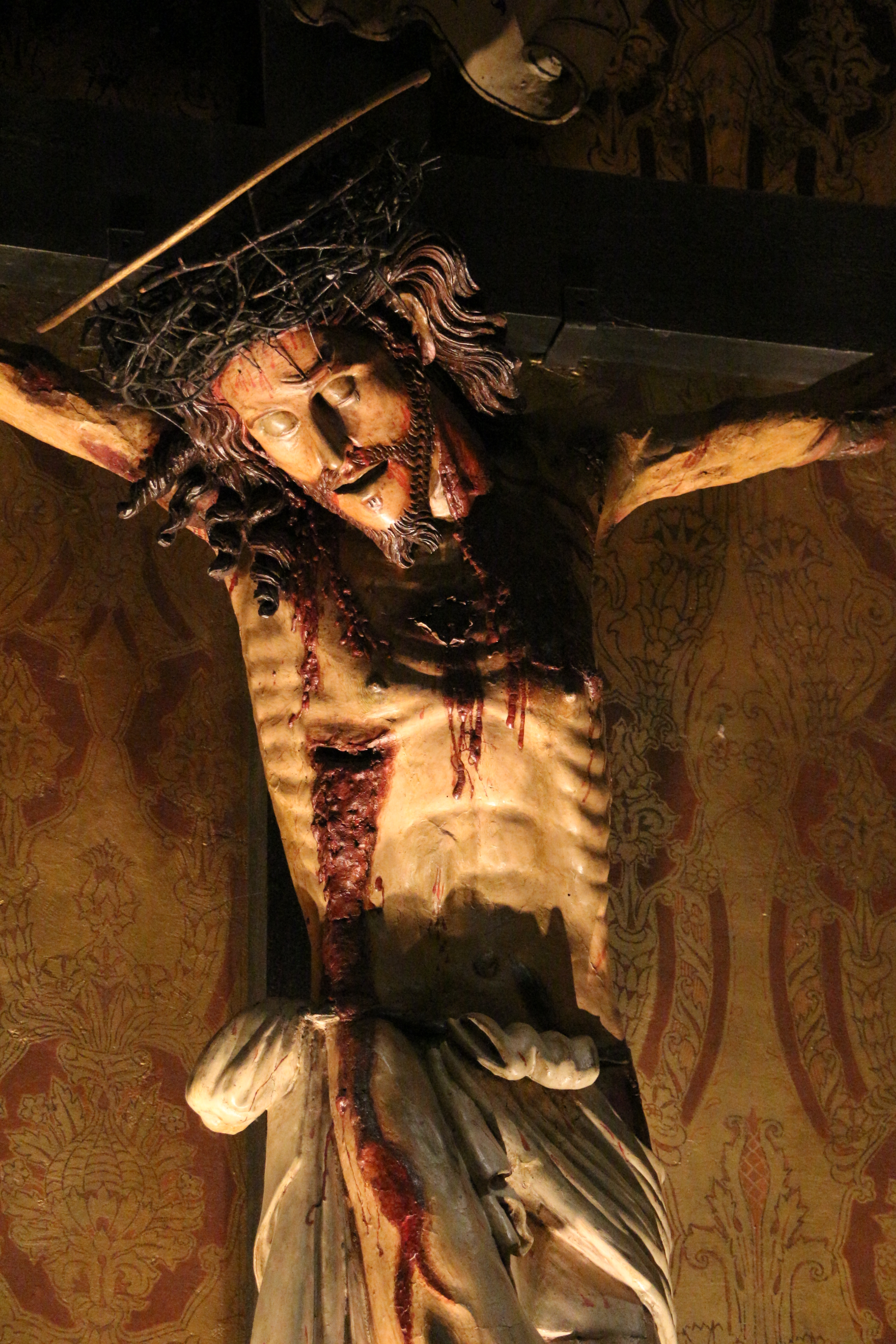
Wooden crucifix at its chapel

In the 1600s, a Mass and a Marian litany was approved. The "Litany of Loreto" is the Litany of the Blessed Virgin Mary, one of the five litanies approved for public recitation by the Church.

Devotion to Our Lady of Loreto has been increasing among Eastern Orthodox Christians, especially from Russia and Romania, who have organized pilgrimages to Loreto and have been permitted to celebrate Divine Liturgies in the Holy House. The icon of the Mother of God Прибавление ума is based on the statue of Our Lady of Loreto. and is invoked for healing of mental illness; finding inner balance and harmony; consolation in sorrows and griefs; assistance in studying and acquiring new knowledge (for oneself and one's children); and assistance in making the right decisions. The prototype was enshrined in the Cathedral of the Transfiguration of the Savior in Rybinsk, but is now lost. The oldest existing copy is at the Church of the Intercession in Tutayev. Another miraculous copy is kept at the Church of the Tikhvin Icon of the Mother of God in Moscow. The nuns of Pokrovo-Tervenichesky Monastery have enshrined a copy of the Loreto statue at their skete of the Mother of God, Inexhaustible Chalice. In July 2020, the Holy Synod of the Russian Orthodox Church approved an Akathist to the Mother of God Прибавление ума. The icon is commememorated on August 15 or on the first Sunday following the 15th.

=== Feast day ===
In October 2019 Pope Francis restored to the universal Roman calendar, the feast of Our Lady of Loreto, as an optional memorial commemorated on 10 December.

=== Patronage ===
In 1920 Pope Benedict XV declared the Madonna of Loreto patron saint of air travellers and pilots.

=== Iconography ===
The Santa Casa is occasionally represented in religious art borne by angels.

== Notable people ==
- Giuseppe de Rossi (mid-17th century – c. 1719–1720), maestro di cappella at the Basilica della Santa Casa from 1701 to 1711

== In popular culture ==
Due to Our Lady of Loreto being the patroness of aviators, Charles Lindbergh took a Loreto statuette with him on his 1927 flight across the Atlantic, and Apollo 8 carried a Loreto medallion on its 1968 flight to the Moon.

== See also ==
- Basilica of the Annunciation in Nazareth
- House of the Virgin Mary near Ephesus
- Our Lady of Loreto and St Winefride's, Kew
- Territorial prelature of Loreto
  - Giovanni Tonucci (b. 1941), archbishop in charge of Loreto since 2007
- Late medieval domes
- Italian Renaissance domes

== Bibliography ==
- Grimaldi, Floriano (1984). La Chiesa di Santa Maria di Loreto nei documenti dei secoli XII - XV (in Italian and Latin). Ancona: Stabilimento Tipografico Mierma.
- Grimaldi, Floriano (1993). La historia della Chiesa di Santa Maria de Loreto (in Italian). Loreto: Carilo.
- Hutchison, William Antony (1863). Loreto and Nazareth: Two Lectures, Containing the Results of Personal Investigation of the Two Sanctuaries. London: E. Dillon.
- Leopardi, Monaldo (1841). La Santa Casa di Loreto: discussioni istoriche e critiche (in Italian). Lugano: presso Francesco Veladini e C. p. 1.
- Vélez, Karin (2018). The Miraculous Flying House of Loreto: Spreading Catholicism in the Early Modern World. Princeton University Press. ISBN 978-0-691-18449-4.
