= Lodovico Lombardo =

Italian sculptor

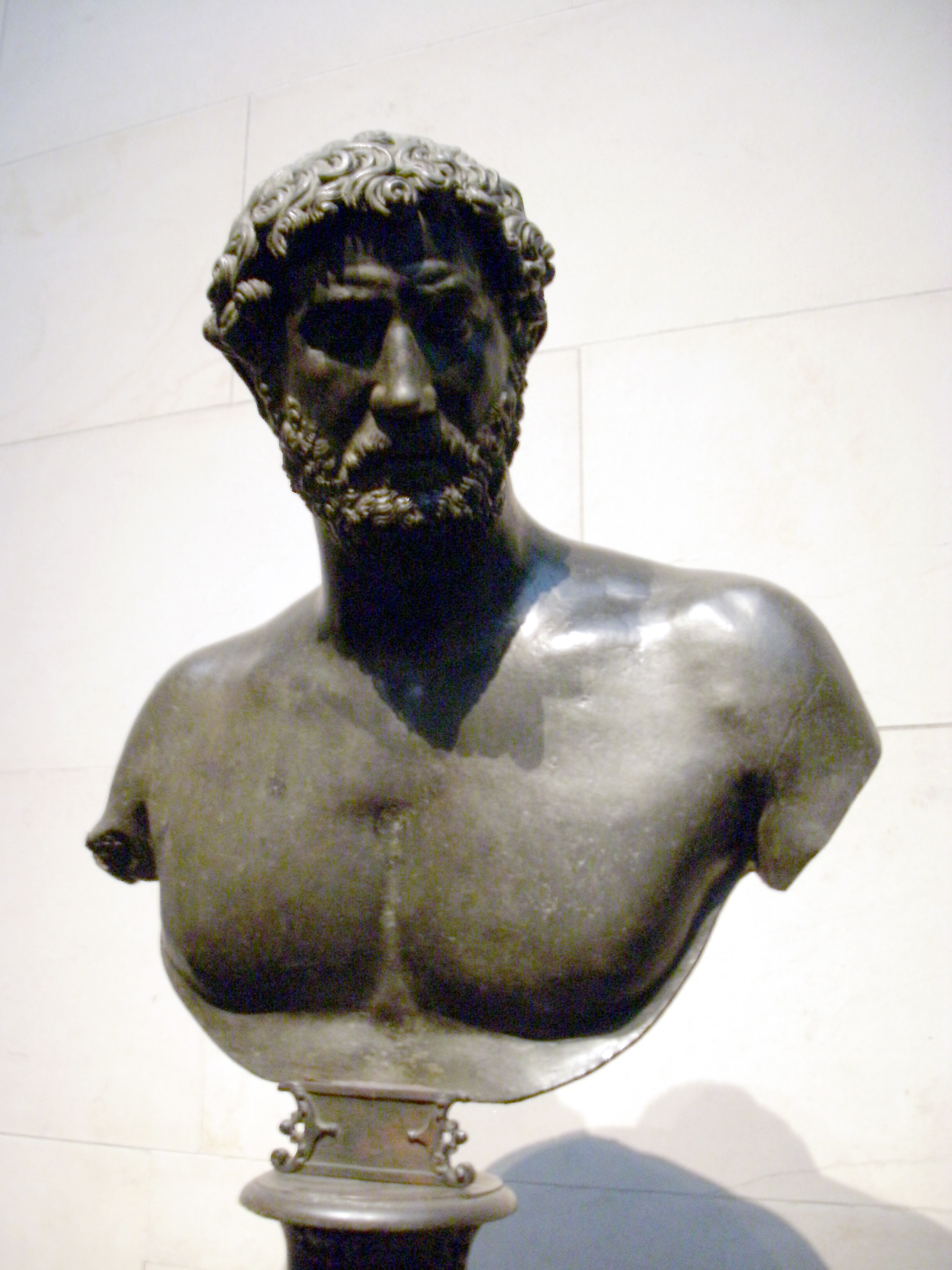
Hadrian, bronze of c. 1550, in the National Gallery of Art

Lodovico Lombardo, sometimes called Ludovico Lombardo or Lombardi (c. 1507/1509–1575), was an Italian sculptor, known primarily for his busts depicting famous figures of antiquity.

He was born in Ferrara, and died in Rome; little else is known about his life or career.

== See also ==
- List of sculptors
