= Loreto, Marche =

Loreto
- Comune
- Comune di Loreto
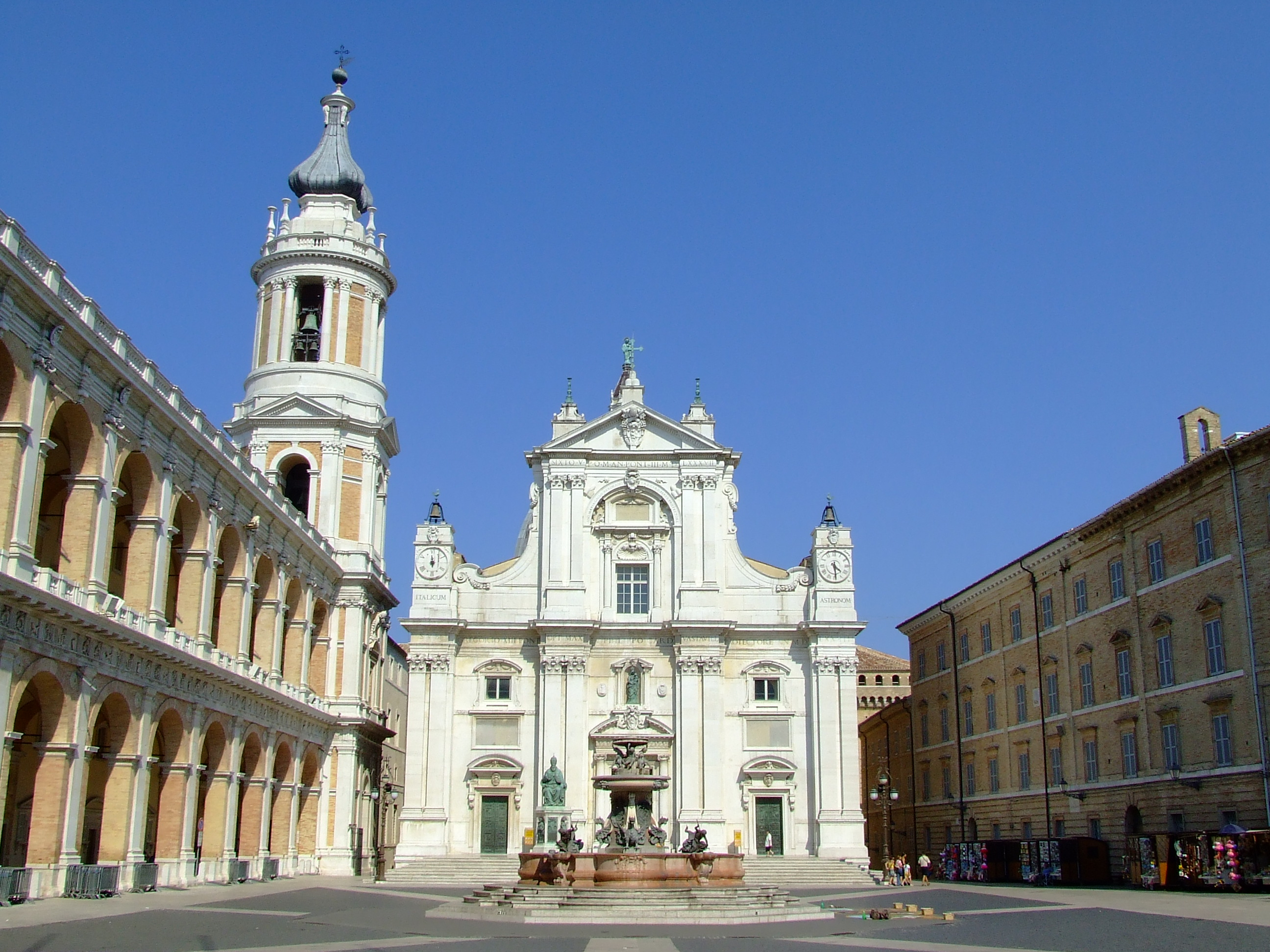
- Piazza della Madonna with façade of the Basilica della Santa Casa

- Coat of arms

- Location within Italy Location within Marche
- Coordinates: 43°26′20″N 13°36′31″E
- Country: Italy
- Region: Marche
- Province: Ancona (AN)
- Frazioni: Costabianca, Grotte, Stazione, Villa Berghigna, Villa Costantina, Villa Musone, Villa Papa

Government
  - Mayor: Moreno Pieroni

Area
  - Total: 17.69 km^{2} (6.83 sq mi)
- Elevation: 127 m (417 ft)

Population (31 August 2024)
  - Total: 13,070
  - Density: 738.8/km^{2} (1,914/sq mi)
- Demonym: Loretani or Lauretani
- Time zone: UTC+1 (CET)
  - Summer (DST): UTC+2 (CEST)
- Postal code: 60025
- Dialing code: 071
- Patron saint: Birth of the Blessed Virgin Mary
- Saint day: 8 September
- Website: Official website

Loreto (/ləˈrɛtoʊ/ lə-RET-oh, US also /ləˈreɪtoʊ/ lə-RAY-toh, Italian: [loˈreːto]) is a hill town and comune of the Italian province of Ancona, in the Marche region. It is most commonly known as the seat of the Basilica della Santa Casa, a popular Catholic pilgrimage site.

== Location ==
Loreto is located 127 meters (417 feet) above sea level on the right bank of the Musone river and 22 kilometers (14 miles) by rail south-southeast of Ancona; like many places in the Marche, it provides good views from the Apennines to the Adriatic.

== Main sights ==
The city's main monuments occupy the four sides of the piazza: the college of the Jesuits; the Palazzo Comunale (formerly the Palazzo Apostolico), designed by Bramante, that houses an art gallery with works of Lorenzo Lotto, Vouet and Annibale Carracci as well as a collection of maiolica, and the Shrine of the Holy House (Santuario della Santa Casa). It also boasts a massive line of walls, designed by the architect (and military engineer) Antonio da Sangallo the Younger, which were erected from 1518 and reinforced in the 17th century.

== Gallery ==
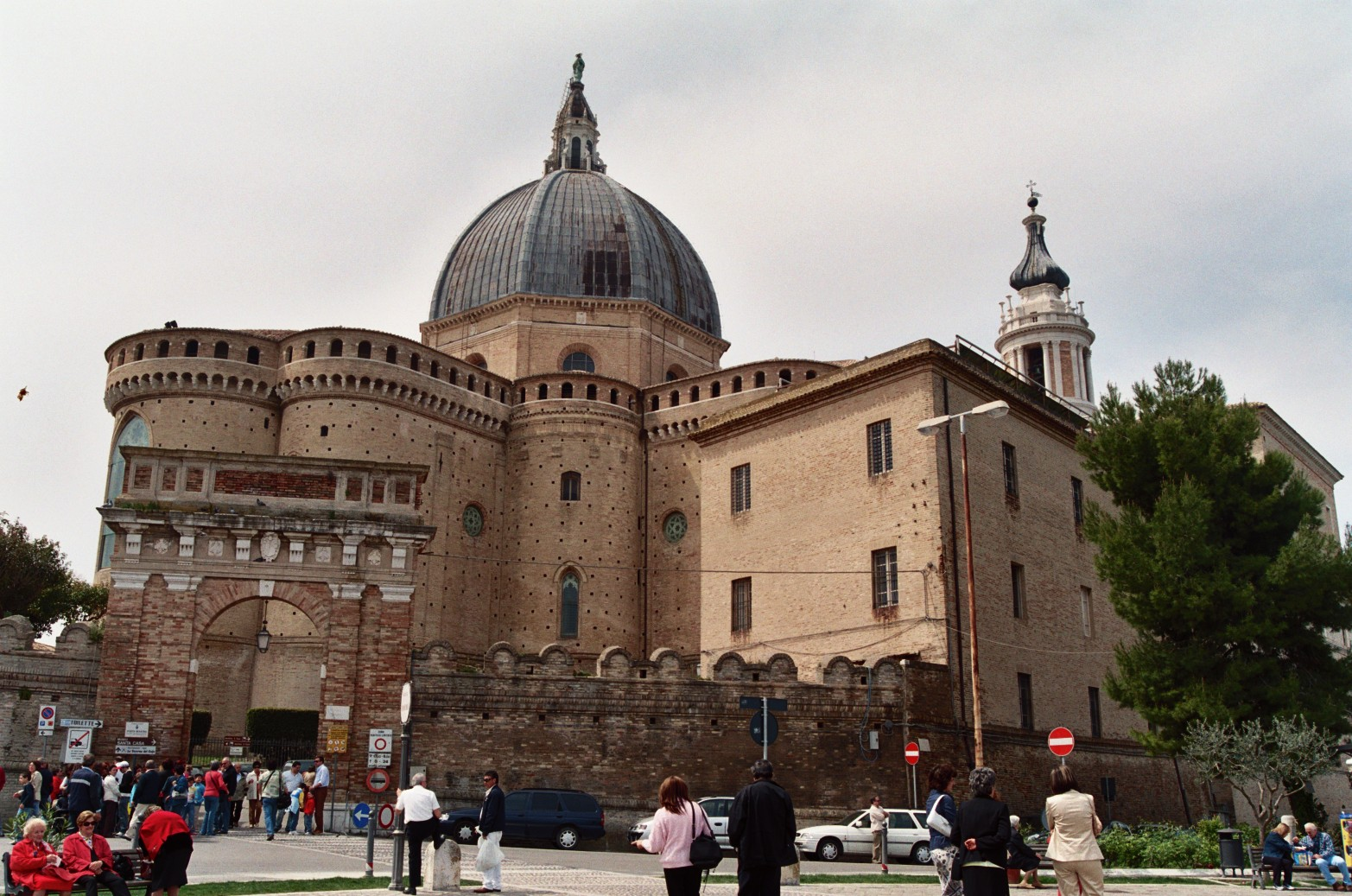
The Basilica della Santa Casa from behind

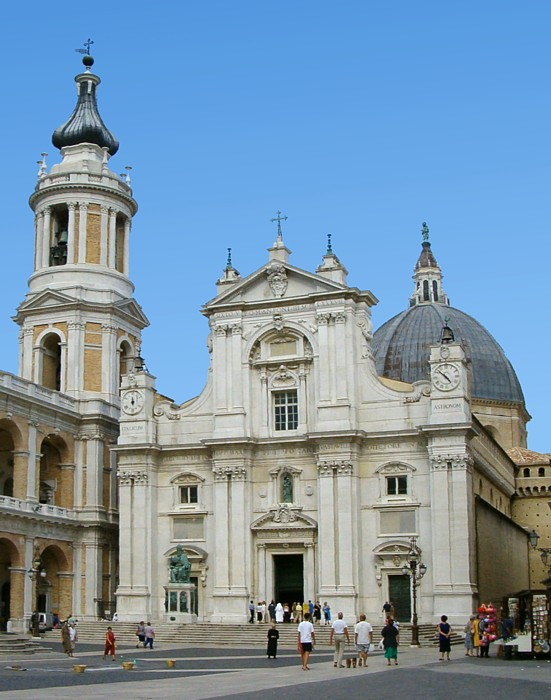
The Basilica della Santa Casa

== Twin towns and sister cities ==
Loreto is twinned with:

- Mariazell, Austria
- Fátima, Portugal
- Altötting, Germany
- Częstochowa, Poland
- Lourdes, France
- Nazareth, Israel
- Harissa, Lebanon
- Għajnsielem, Malta

== See also ==
- Shrine of the Holy House
- Shrines to the Virgin Mary
- Territorial prelature of Loreto
- Sisters of Loreto
