= Willybard Kitogho Lagho =

Kenyan Catholic prelate

The Most Reverend Willybard Kitogho Lagho
- Bishop of Malindi, Kenya
- Church: Catholic Church
- Archdiocese: Roman Catholic Archdiocese of Mombasa
- See: Malindi
- Appointed: 28 December 2020
- Installed: 19 March 2021
- Predecessor: Emanuel Barbara
- Successor: Incumbent

Orders
- Ordination: 25 April 1987
- Consecration: 19 March 2021 by Hubertus Matheus Maria van Megen

Personal details
- Born: Willybard Kitogho Lagho; 23 March 1958 (age 68) Taita–Taveta County, Diocese of Mombasa, Kenya

Willybard Kitogho Lagho (born 23 March 1958) is a Kenyan Roman Catholic prelate who is the Bishop of the Roman Catholic Diocese of Malindi, Kenya. He was appointed bishop on 28 December 2020 by Pope Francis.

== Early life and education ==
He was born on 23 March 1958 in Taita-Taveta County, Diocese of Mombasa, in Kenya. He studied at St. James Primary School in Mgange Dawida Village, in Taita-Taveta, from 1965 until 1974. He attended St. Charles Lwanga Secondary School in Mombasa for his O-Level education between 1974 and 1978. He then completed his A-Level studies at Queen Apostles Minor Seminary in Nairobi, from 1978 until 1980.

From 1980 until 1982, he studied Philosophy at the Saint Augustine's Seminary at Mabanga in the Diocese of Bungoma. He then studied Theology at Saint Thomas Aquinas Seminary in the Archdiocese of Nairobi from 1982 until 1986.

He holds a Diploma in Arabic Language, from the Pontifical Institute for Arabic and Islamic Studies in Rome, Italy. The same institute also awarded him a Licentiate in Arabic and Islamic Studies. Later, he graduated with a Master's degree in Religious Studies from the Catholic University of Eastern Africa (CUEA).

== Priest ==
He was ordained a deacon on 21 December 1985. On 25 April 1987 he was ordained a priest of the Diocese of Mombasa, Kenya. He served in that capacity until 28 December 2020.

As a priest, he served in various roles, including as:

- Assistant parish priest at St. Michael's Parish, Giriama, Archdiocese of Mombasa from 1987 until 1988.
- Director of Youth and Vocation affairs at the Archdiocese of Mombasa from 1987 until 1988.
- Parish priest at Christ the King Parish in Miritini from 1989 until 1990.
- Director of Youth and Vocation affairs at the Archdiocese of Mombasa from 1989 until 1990.
- Rector of St. Mary's Minor Seminary in Kwale, the Archdiocese of Mombasa from 1990 until 1992.
- Formator and lecturer at St. Matthias Mulumba Tindinyo Seminary from 2000 until 2001.
- Rector and formator at St. Augustine's Seminary in Bungoma from 2002 until 2006.
- Pastor of Our Lady of Fatima Parish, Kongowea from 2007 until 2008.
- Secretary of Education of the Catholic Archdiocese of Mombasa from 2007 until 2008.
- Vicar General of the Archdiocese of Mombasa from 2013 until 2020.

== Bishop ==
On 28 December 2020 Pope Francis appointed him Bishop of the Roman Catholic Diocese of Malindi, to succeed Bishop Emanuel Barbara, who died in 2018. He was consecrated and installed at Malindi on 19 March 2021 by the hands of Archbishop Hubertus Matheus Maria van Megen, Titular Archbishop of Novaliciana assisted by Archbishop Martin Kivuva Musonde, Archbishop of Mombasa and Archbishop Philip Arnold Subira Anyolo, Archbishop of Kisumu.

In April 2024, the members of the Kenya Conference of Catholic Bishops (KCCB), elected Bishop Willybard Kitogho Lagho as the chairman of the conference's Commission for Interreligious Dialogue and Ecumenism (CIRDE). He is deputized by Bishop Joseph Ndembu Mbatia of Nyahururu, until the next elections in 2027. In June the same year, he was elected chairman of the Inter Religious Council of Kenya.

== See also ==
- Catholic Church in Kenya

== Succession table ==
Catholic Church titles
Preceded by Emanuel Barbara (9 July 2011 - 5 January 2018)	Bishop of Malindi (since 28 December 2020)	Succeeded by Incumbent
