= George Muthaka =

Kenyan Roman Catholic prelate (born 1974)

- Bishop of Garissa, Kenya
- Church: Roman Catholic Church
- Archdiocese: Roman Catholic Archdiocese of Mombasa
- See: Garissa
- Appointed: 29 April 2023
- Installed: 5 August 2023
- Predecessor: Joseph Alessandro
- Previous post: Vicar-General of Garissa Diocese (2017–2022)

Orders
- Ordination: 28 June 2003 by David Kamau Ng'ang'a
- Consecration: 17 February 2022 by Archbishop Hubertus Matheus Maria van Megen
- Rank: Bishop

Personal details
- Born: George Muthaka; 28 December 1974 (age 51) Ruiru, Kiambu County, Archdiocese of Nairobi, Kenya

Styles of George Muthaka
- Reference style
- Religious style: Bishop

George Muthaka O.F.M. Cap., (born 28 December 1974), is a Roman Catholic prelate in Kenya, who is the bishop of the Roman Catholic Diocese of Garissa, since February 2022. He was appointed bishop by Pope Francis on 17 February 2022. Prior to his appointment as Bishop of Garissa, Monsignor George Muthaka served as the vicar-general of the Roman Catholic Diocese of Garissa, Kenya. He was consecrated and installed at Garissa on 7 May 2022.

== Early life and education ==
Muthaka was born on 28 December 1974 at Ruiru, in Kiambu County, Archdiocese of Nairobi, in central Kenya. He studied philosophy at St. Bonaventure University College in Lusaka, Zambia between 1996 and 1999.He then studied theology at Tangaza University College in Nairobi, Kenya from 1999 until 2003. From 2015 until 2017, he studied at Villanova University in Pennsylvania, United States, where he graduated with a Master's degree in Church Management. He also holds a master's degree in psychology, awarded by Divine Mercy University, in Virginia, United States.

== Priesthood ==
He took his perpetual vows as a member of the Order of Friars Minor Capuchin on 31 August 2002. He was ordained a priest of that Catholic religious order on 28 June 2003, by Bishop David Kamau Ng'ang'a, Titular Bishop of Oëa and Auxiliary Bishop of Nairobi. Father George Muthaka, O.F.M. Cap. served in various roles as a priest of the Roman Catholic Archdiocese of Nairobi. He served as the vicar-general of Garissa Diocese from 2017 until 2022, when he was appointed bishop of Garissa.

== As bishop ==
He was appointed bishop of the Roman Catholic Diocese Garissa on 17 Feb 2022. He was consecrated bishop and installed at Garissa on 7 May 2022 by the hands of Archbishop Hubertus Matheus Maria van Megen, Titular Archbishop of Novaliciana and Papal nuncio assisted by Bishop Joseph Alessandro, Bishop Emeritus of Garissa and Archbishop Martin Kivuva Musonde, Archbishop of Mombasa. Bishop George Muthaka took over the diocese from Bishop Joseph Alessandro O.F.M. Cap., the bishop emeritus of Garissa, Kenya who retired, having attained the mandatory retirement age of 75 years for Catholic bishops.

== See also ==
- Roman Catholicism in Kenya

== Succession table ==
Catholic Church titles
| Preceded by Joseph Alessandro (8 December 2015 – 17 February 2022) | Bishop of Garissa (since 17 February 2022) | Succeeded by Incumbent |
