= John Mbua Mwandi =

Kenyan Catholic prelate (born 1970)

The Most Reverend John Mbua Mwandi
- Bishop of Kitui; Kenya
- Church: Catholic Church
- Archdiocese: Roman Catholic Archdiocese of Nairobi
- See: Diocese of Kitui
- Appointed: 27 May 2026
- Installed: 8 August 2026
- Predecessor: Joseph Maluki Mwongela (17 March 2020 - 4 January 2026)

Orders
- Ordination: 8 December 2001
- Consecration: 8 August 2026

Personal details
- Born: John Mbua Mwandi; 24 September 1970 (age 55) Githunguri Kiambu County, Kenya
- Motto: "SERVE ALL IN LOVE"

Styles of Joh Mbua Mwandi
- Reference style: His Grace; The Most Reverend
- Spoken style: Your Grace
- Religious style: Bishop

John Mbua Mwandi (born 24 September 1970) is a Kenyan Catholic prelate who was appointed Bishop of the Roman Catholic Diocese of Kitui, in Kenya on 27 May 2026. Before that, from 8 December 2001 until 27 May 2026, he served as a priest of the same Catholic See. He was appointed bishop by Pope Leo XIV.

== Background and education ==
He was born on 24 September 1970. He studied philosophy at Saint Augustine's Senior Seminary in the Roman Catholic Diocese of Bungoma. He then studied theology at Saint Matthias Mulumba Senior Seminary of the Roman Catholic Diocese of Kapsabet. In 2008, he studies at the Kenya Institute of Management in Nairobi, graduating with a diploma in Project Management.

== Priest ==
He was ordained a prieston 8 December 2001 and was incardinated in the Catholic Diocese of Kitui. He served as a priest until 27 May 2026. While a priest, he served in various roles and locations, including:

- Parish vicar in Ikutha Parish in 2002.
- Parish priest in Miambani Parish from 2001 until 2005.
- Parish priest of Ikanga Parish in 2006.
- Parish priest of the Diocesan Cathedral of Kitui from 2007 until 2011.
- Dean of the Eastern Deanery in 2005.
- Studies at the Kenya Institute of Management in Nairobi, graduating with a diploma in Project Management in 2008.
- Diocesan bursar of Kitui Diocese from 2011 until 2020.
- Pro-vicar general of Kitui Diocese frrom 2016 until 2020.
- Vicar general of Kitui Diocese.
- Parish priest of Mulutu Parish from 2020 until 2026.

== Bishop ==
He was appointed as Bishop of Kitui on 27 May 2026 by Pope Leo XIV. He succeeded Bishop Joseph Maluki Mwongela, who was transferred to the Catholic Diocese of Machakos and appointed Coadjutor Bishop there on 4 January 2026. Bishop Mwandi was consecrated as Bishop at Kitui on 8 August 2026.

== See also ==
- Roman Catholicism in Kenya

== Succession table ==
Catholic Church titles
Preceded by Joseph Maluki Mwongela (17 March 2020 - 4 January 2026)	Bishop of Kitui (since 27 May 2026)	Succeeded by (Incumbent)
