= Holy Ghost Cathedral, Mombasa =

Mombasa Cathedral
- Holy Ghost Cathedral
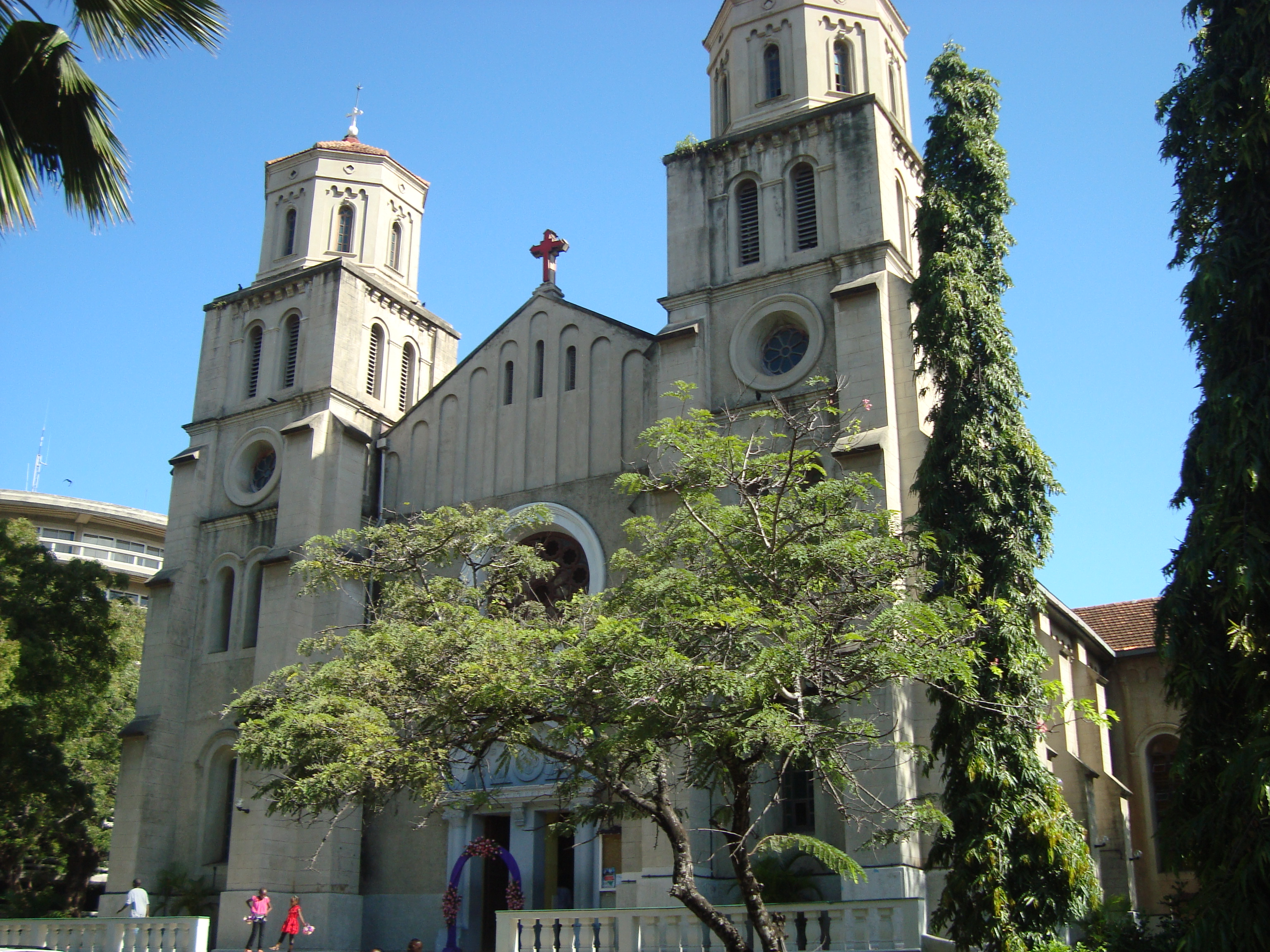
- Holy Ghost Cathedral in Mombasa, Kenya

- Location in Mombasa, Kenya Mombasa Cathedral (Kenya)
- 4°03′49″S 39°40′18″E
- Location: Mombasa
- Country: Kenya
- Denomination: Catholic Church

Architecture
- Completed: 1923

Administration
- Archdiocese: Archdiocese of Mombasa

Clergy
- Archbishop: Martin Kivuva Musonde

The Holy Ghost Cathedral or just Mombasa Cathedral, is the main place of Catholic worship in the city of Mombasa, Kenya, and the seat of the Bishop of the Archdiocese of Mombasa.

The first "Catholic mission" of Mombasa was founded in 1889 by Father Alexander le Roy, a Missionary of the Holy Spirit. The residence and the chapel of the first missionaries was in Ndia Kuu (the ancient city of Mombasa), but in 1895 the living conditions had become unbearable, and it was necessary to build a larger building. In January 1898 he bought five acres in what is known as 'Makadara' area, where today is the cathedral.

On Easter Sunday 1898 the church was completed, but in the early twentieth century, the building was already insufficient to accommodate the number of the faithful increasingly growing. Thus in 1919 plans were made to build a new church in Mombasa and in 1923 the church was completed.

== See also ==
- Roman Catholicism in Kenya
- Holy Ghost Church
