= Roman Catholic Diocese of Kitui =

Roman Catholic diocese in Kenya

Coordinates: 1.3670°S 38.0125°E

Diocese of Kitui Dioecesis Kituiensis

Location
- Country: Kenya

Statistics
- Area: 30,246 km^{2} (11,678 sq mi)
- Population: Total; Catholics: (as of 2013); 1,1m; 240,000 (21.8%)

Information
- Sui iuris church: Latin Church
- Rite: Roman Rite
- Cathedral: Cathedral of Our Lady of Africa

Current leadership
- Pope: Leo XIV
- Bishop: John Mbua Mwandi

The Roman Catholic Diocese of Kitui (Latin: Kituien(sis)) is a diocese located in the city of Kitui in the ecclesiastical province of Nairobi in Kenya.

== History ==
- February 20, 1956: Established as Apostolic Prefecture of Kitui from the Diocese of Meru and Metropolitan Archdiocese of Nairobi
- November 16, 1963: Promoted as Diocese of Kitui

== Leadership ==
- Prefects Apostolic of Kitui (Latin Church)
  - Father William Dunne, S.P.S. (1956.10.19 – 1963.11.16); see below
- Bishops of Kitui (Latin Church)
  - Bishop William Dunne, S.P.S. (1963.11.16 – 1995.11.02); see above
  - Bishop Boniface Lele (1995.11.02 – 2005.04.01), appointed Archbishop of Mombasa
  - Bishop Martin Kivuva Musonde (Apostolic Administrator 2007.05 - ?)
  - Bishop Anthony Muheria (2008.10.08 - 2017.04.23) (catholic-hierarchy has appointment 2008.06.28), appointed Archbishop of Nyeri
  - Bishop Joseph Mwongela (17 Marh 2020 - 4 January 2026)
  - Bishop John Mbua Mwandi (Appointed 27 May 2026)

Catholic Diocese of Kitui covers the County of Kitui, consisting of four former Administrative Districts of Kyuso, Mwingi, Kitui and Mutomo, an arid and semi arid area of approximately 30,142 km in Eastern Kenya. It has a population of around 1.09 million people with over 240,000 baptized Catholics (*Source: Central Statistics of the State; Secretariat of State; (2011)

The first Missionaries to evangelize Kitui were Holy Ghost fathers (Congregation of the Holy Spirit) from Kabaa (Machakos diocese) in early 1930s. At the time the Holy Ghost Fathers were introducing Christianity in Kitui, the Consolata Missionaries from Meru were evangelizing in the northern side of Kitui bordering Tharaka, present day Kimangau. The first Mass was celebrated in Museve Hill by a Holy Ghost priest. The first Mission house was built in 1945 at Mutune. Kitui Apostolic Prefecture was carved out from the Archdiocese of Nairobi in 1956 and placed under care of Saint Patrick's Society for the Foreign Missions (also known as the Kiltegan Fathers). In 1964 it was erected as a diocese on 16 November 1963, with His Lordship, the late Right Rev. William Dunne as the first Bishop (R.I.P) on 9 February 1964. Bishop Dunne retired on 2 November 1995. The first diocesan priests in the diocese were Frs. Peter Muema Kyumbua and Boniface Lele Emeritus Archbishop of Mombasa (RIP), who were ordained in 1974.

Following the retirement of Bishop Dunne, Bishop Boniface Lele was appointed as Bishop of Kitui and ordained as bishop on 2 February 1996 succeeding him. Archbishop Lele was appointed Archbishop of Archdiocese of Mombasa on 1 April 2005. Rev. Fr. Paul Healy was the Diocesan Administrator until the appointment of Rt. Rev. Bishop Martin Kivuva as the Apostolic Administrator. On 28 July 2008, Rt. Rev. Anthony Muheria was appointed bishop of Kitui taking possession on 10 August 2008.

== See also ==
- Roman Catholicism in Kenya
- Kenya Conference of Catholic Bishops

== Sources ==
- GCatholic.org
- Catholic Hierarchy
- catholic diocese of Kitui website
