= Baldachin =

Cloth of honour above a throne associated with monarchs

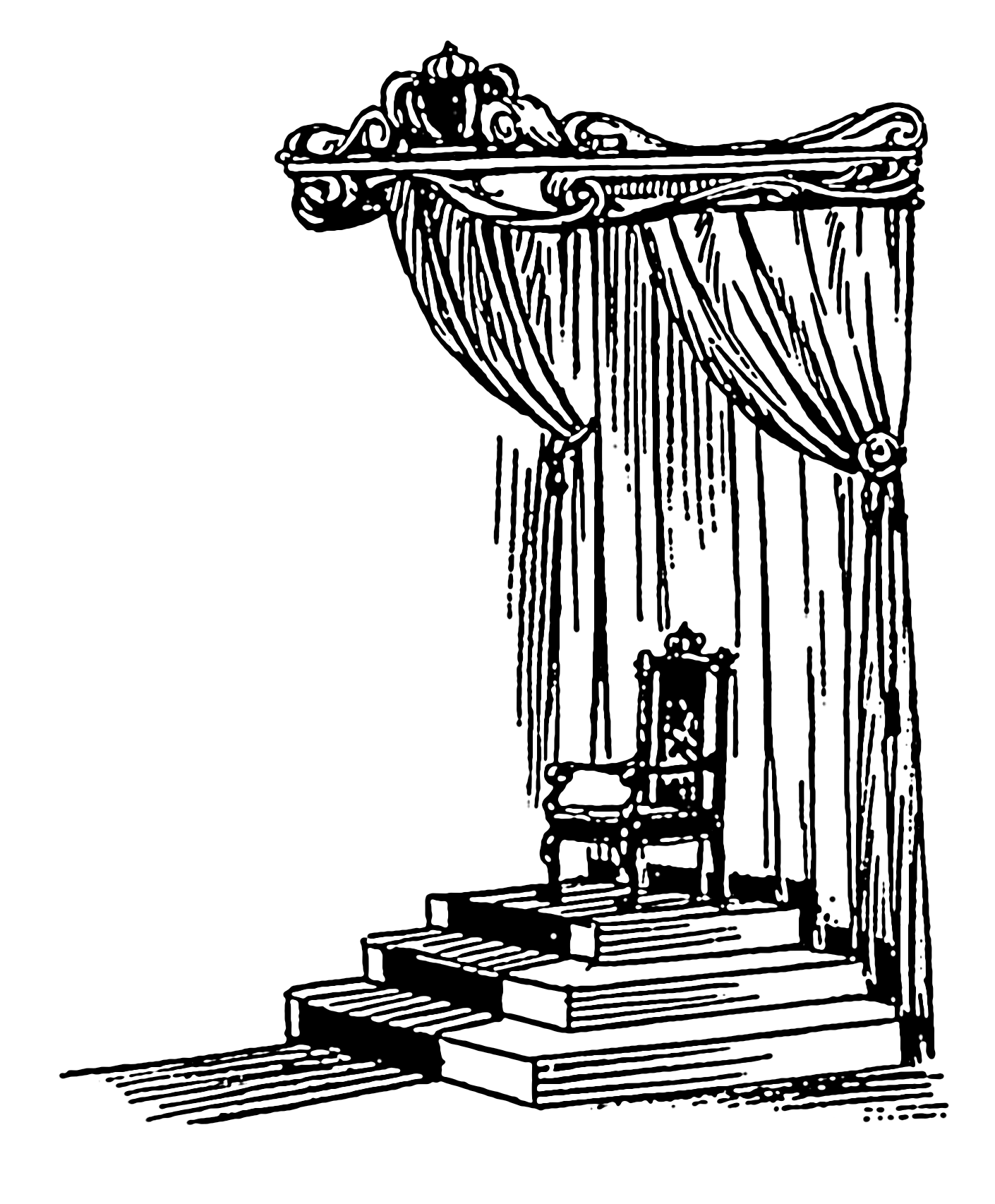
Drawing of a baldachin over a throne, placed on a dais

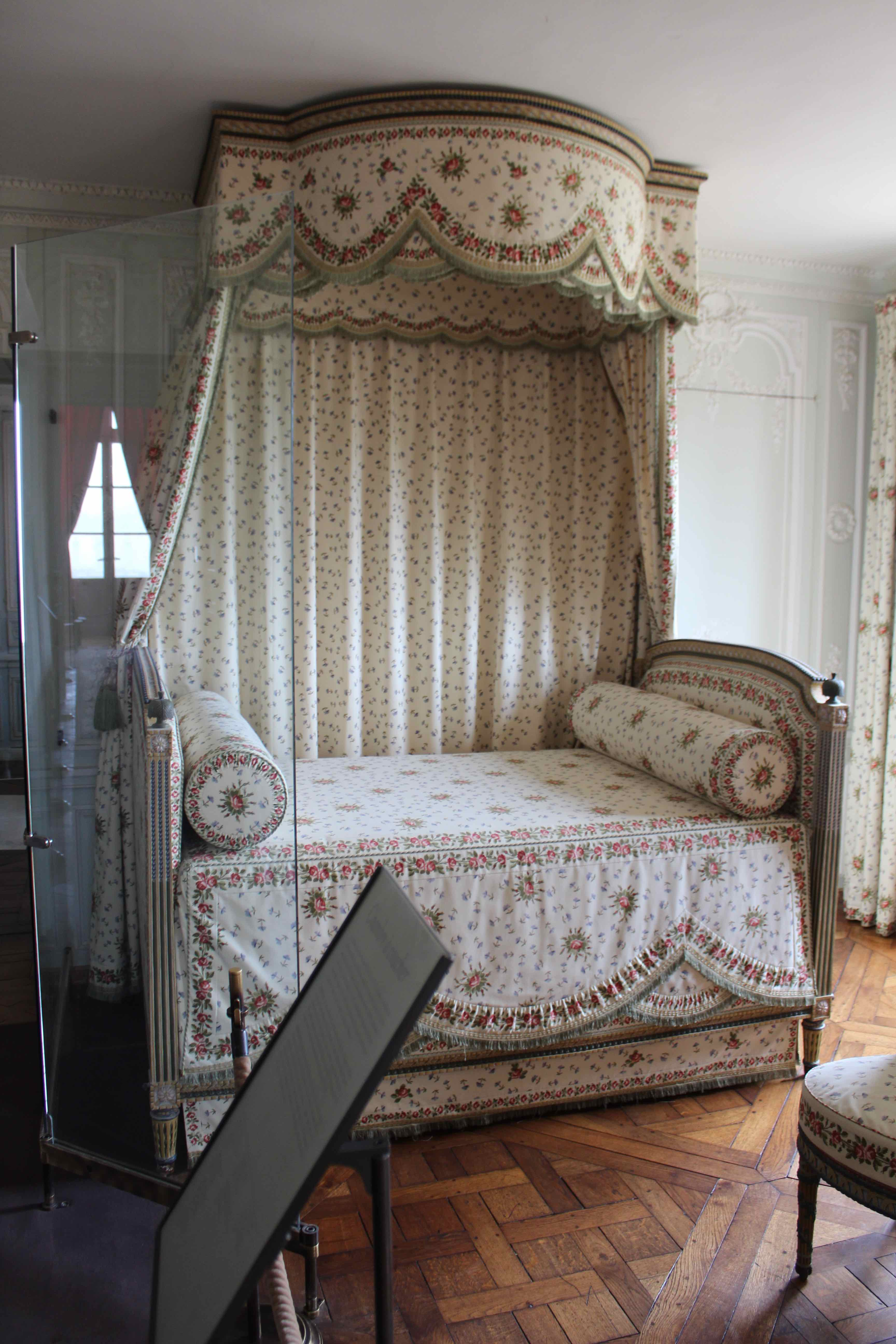
Marie Antoinette's bed, which has a baldachin, in the Petit Trianon (Versailles, France)

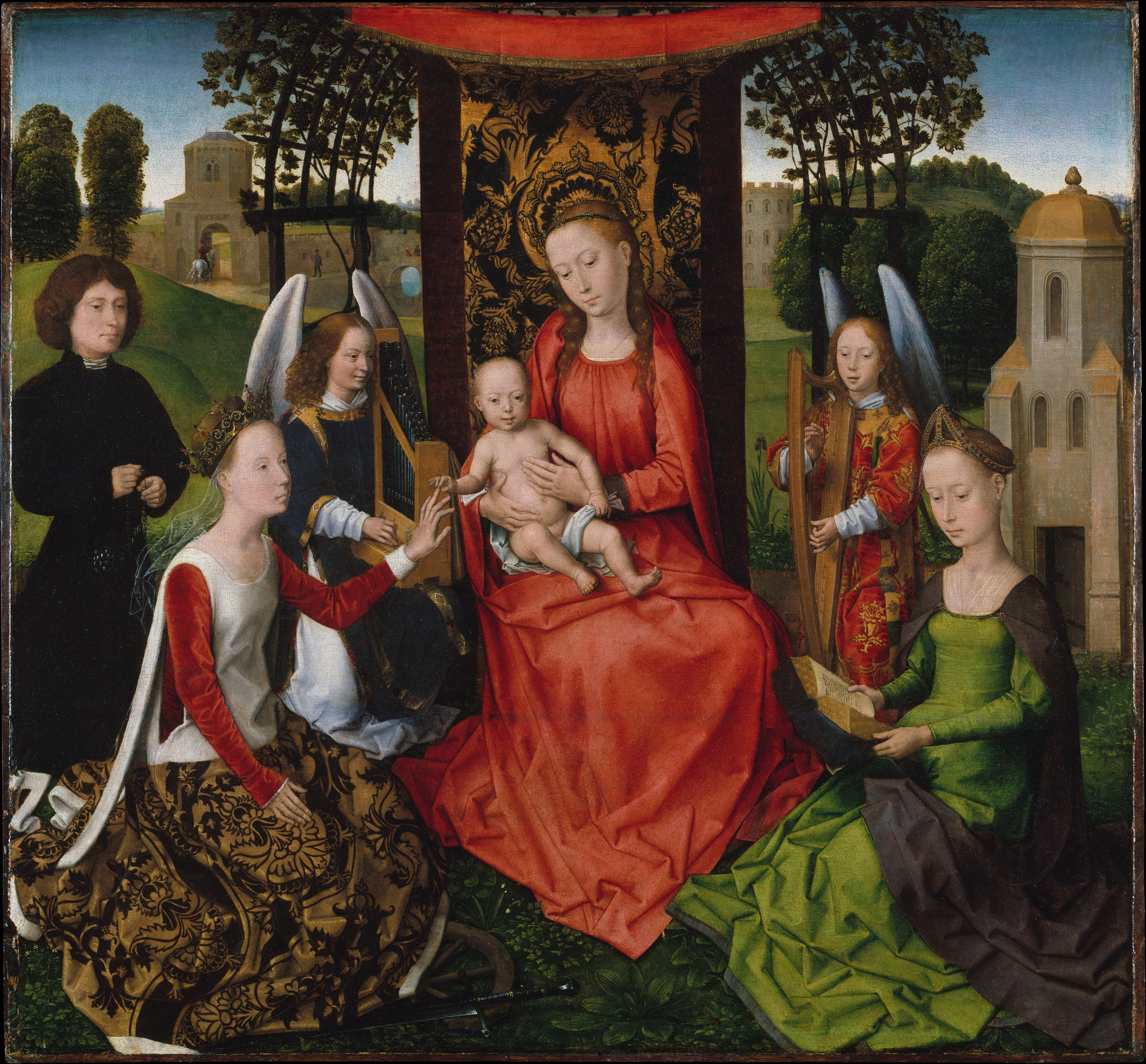
Enthroned Virgin Mary with cloth of honour by Hans Memling

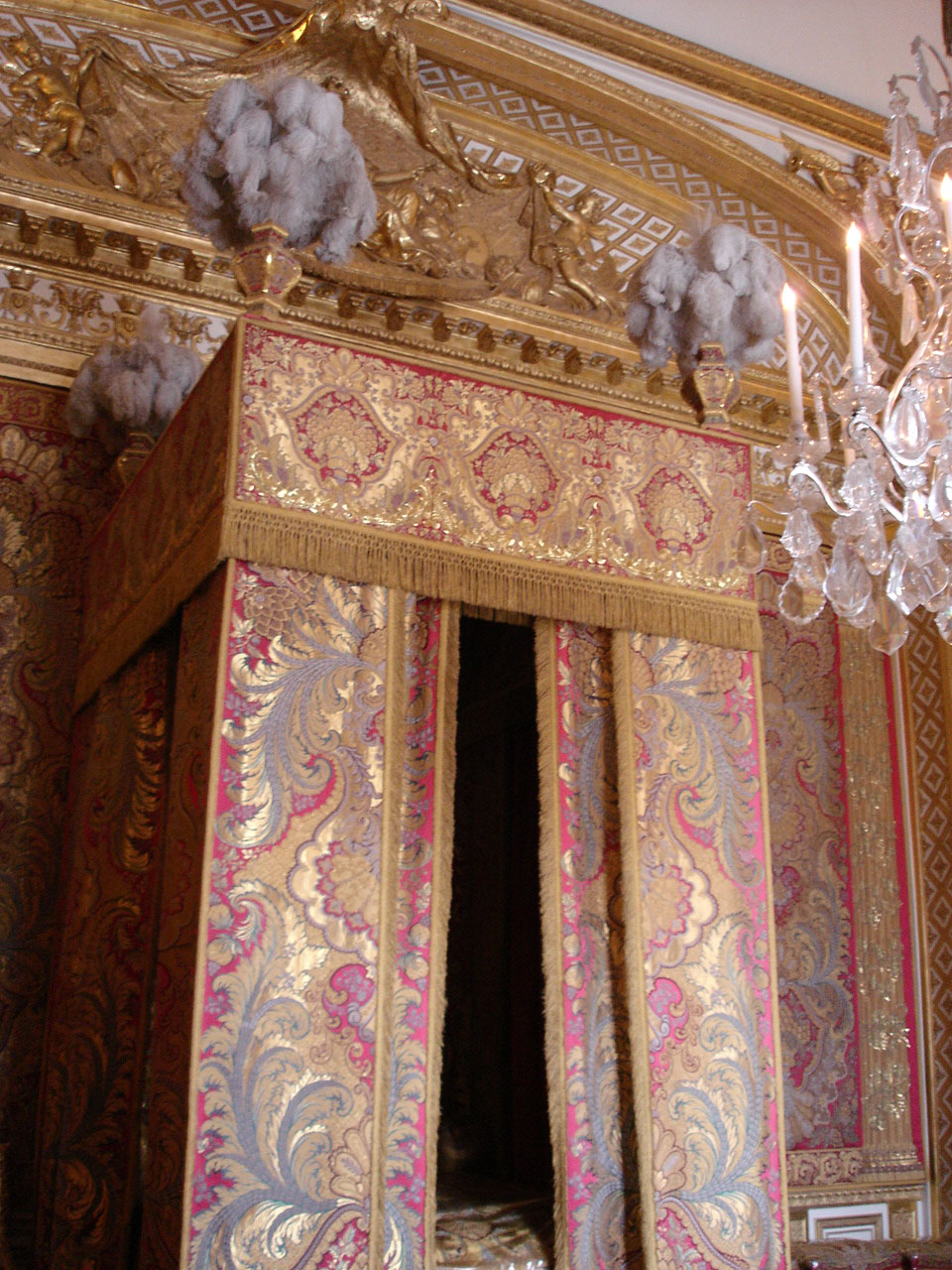
State bed of Louis XIV, Chambre du Roi, Versailles

A baldachin, or baldaquin (from Italian: baldacchino), is a canopy of state typically placed over an altar or throne. It had its beginnings as a cloth canopy, (Note: Baldac is a medieval Latin form for Baghdad, whence fine silks reached Europe.) but in other cases it is a sturdy, permanent architectural feature, particularly over high altars in cathedrals, where such a structure is more correctly called a ciborium when it is sufficiently architectural in form. Baldachins are often supported on columns, especially when they are disconnected from an enclosing wall.

A cloth of honour or cloth of estate is a simpler cloth hanging vertically behind the throne, usually continuing to form a canopy. It can also be used for similar canopies in interior design, for example above beds, and for processional canopies used in formal state ceremonies such as coronations, held up by four or more men with poles attached to the corners of the cloth.

"Baldachin" was originally a luxurious type of cloth from Baghdad, from which name the word is ultimately derived, appearing in English as "baudekin" and other spellings. Matthew Paris records that Henry III of England wore a robe "de preciosissimo baldekino" at a ceremony at Westminster Abbey in 1247. The word for the cloth became the word for the ceremonial canopies made from the cloth.

== Canopies of state ==
In the Middle Ages, a hieratic canopy of state (or "estate"), cloth of honour, or cloth of state was hung above the seat of a personage of sufficient standing, as a symbol of authority. The seat under such a canopy of state would normally be raised on a dais. The cloth above a seat generally continued vertically down to the ground behind the seat. Emperors and kings, reigning dukes and bishops were accorded this honour. In a 15th-century manuscript illumination the sovereign Grand Master of the Knights Hospitaller in Rhodes sits in state to receive a presentation copy of the author's book. His seat is raised on a carpet-covered dais and backed with a richly embroidered dosser (French, dos). Under his feet is a cushion, such as protected the feet of the King of France when he presided at a lit de justice. The King of France was also covered by a mobile canopy during his coronation, held up on poles by several peers of France. The Virgin Mary in particular is very often shown sitting under a cloth of honour in medieval and Renaissance paintings where she is shown enthroned with saints.

The cloth was often simply a luxurious textile, often imported and with rich patterns, as in brocades, but might have heraldic elements. French kings are often shown with blue cloths patterned with the gold fleur-de-lys. Margaret Beaufort, mother of Henry VII in her portrait by an anonymous artist, c. 1500 prays under a canopy of estate; one can see the dosser against the gilded leather wall-covering and the tester above her head (the Tudor rose at its centre) supported on cords from the ceiling. The coats-of-arms embroidered or woven into the tapestry are of England (parted as usual with France) and the portcullis badge of the Beauforts.

Sometimes, as in the presentation miniature Jean Wauquelin presenting his 'Chroniques de Hainaut' to Philip the Good by Rogier van der Weyden, the cloth continues over the seat, and then to the floor. In the summer of 1520, a meeting was staged between Francis I of France and Henry VIII of England, where the ostentatious display of wealth and power earned the meeting-place the name of The Field of Cloth of Gold. The canopy of estate may still be seen in most formal throne rooms.

When Mary, Queen of Scots, was a prisoner in England at Tutbury Castle in 1585 she protested to her keepers Amias Paulet and John Somers about the removal of her cloth of estate from a dining room, which seemed to be a slight against her royal status.

== State bed ==
=== Ceremonial ===
The state bed, intended for receiving important visitors and producing heirs before a select public, but not intended for sleeping in, evolved during the second half of the seventeenth century, developing the medieval tradition of receiving visitors in the bedroom, which had become the last and most private room of the standard suite of rooms in a Baroque apartment. Louis XIV developed the rituals of receptions in his state bedchamber, the petit lever to which only a handful of his court élite might expect to be invited. The other monarchs of Europe soon imitated his practice; even his staunchest enemy, William III of England, had his "grooms of the bedchamber", a signal honour.

The state bed, a lit à la duchesse—its canopy supported without visible posts—was delivered for the use of Queen Marie Leszczyńska at Versailles, as the centrepiece of a new decor realised for the Queen in 1730–35. (Note: The hangings were rewoven for Marie Antoinette. The present hangings, made at Lyon by the same firm that delivered the originals, replicate the hangings as they were in 1787.) Its tester is quickly recognisable as a baldachin, serving its time-honoured function; the bedding might easily be replaced by a gilded throne. The queens of France spent a great deal of time in their chambre, where they received the ladies of the court at the morning lever and granted private audiences. By the time Marie Antoinette escaped the mob from this bedroom, such state beds, with the elaborate etiquette they embodied, were already falling out of use. A state bed with a domed tester designed in 1775–76 by Robert Adam for Lady Child at Osterley Park (Note: Of this grandiose bed Horace Walpole asked in a private letter "what would Vitruvius think of a dome decorated by a milliner?") and another domed state bed, delivered by Thomas Chippendale for Sir Edwin Lascelles at Harewood House, Yorkshire, in 1773 are two of the last English state beds intended for a main floor State Bedroom in a non-royal residence.

=== For sleep ===
In Britain, monarchs slept in a state bed in the Palace of Westminster the night before their coronation. This tradition was started by William the Conqueror in 1066 and continued until 1821, when George IV was the last monarch to sleep in the bed. The original state bed was damaged in a fire and replaced in 1859. The new bed remained in the Speaker's House until the 1940s, when it was moved out as too opulent to be there during the difficult times of the Second World War. It was probably sold during a government modernisation, somehow appeared in an auction in Northamptonshire, and was bought for a family for £100 in the 1960s. They used it for thirty years, recognising that it was important but not knowing where it came from until an interiors expert at the Victoria and Albert Museum published an appeal to try to find it. The bed was bought back from the family and returned to Speaker's House after restoration and with new hangings. It can be viewed during tours of the Speaker's House.

== St. Peter's Basilica ==
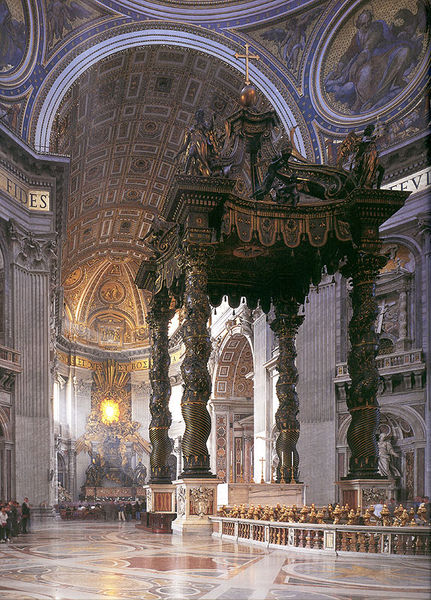
Bernini's St. Peter's Baldachin in St Peter's Basilica, Vatican City

Pope Urban VIII commissioned Gian Lorenzo Bernini to design and construct a large structure that would be placed over the main altar, believed to be above the tomb of Saint Peter, in the new St. Peter's Basilica. The canopy imitated cloth in bronze, as did many subsequent imitations. This famous and spectacular feature is generally called the "Baldacchino", though strictly it is a ciborium.

Bernini's design for the Baldacchino incorporated giant solomonic columns inspired by columns that ringed the altar of the Old St. Peter's. These columns were originally donated by Constantine, and a false tradition asserts they are the columns from the Temple of Jerusalem. The lowest parts of the four columns of Bernini's Baldachin have a helical groove, and the middle and upper sections of the columns are covered in olive and bay branches, which are populated with a myriad of bees and small putti. Pope Urban VIII's family coat of arms, those of the Barberini family, with their signature bees, are at the base of every column.

All of these combine to create a feeling of upward movement.

== Processional canopy ==
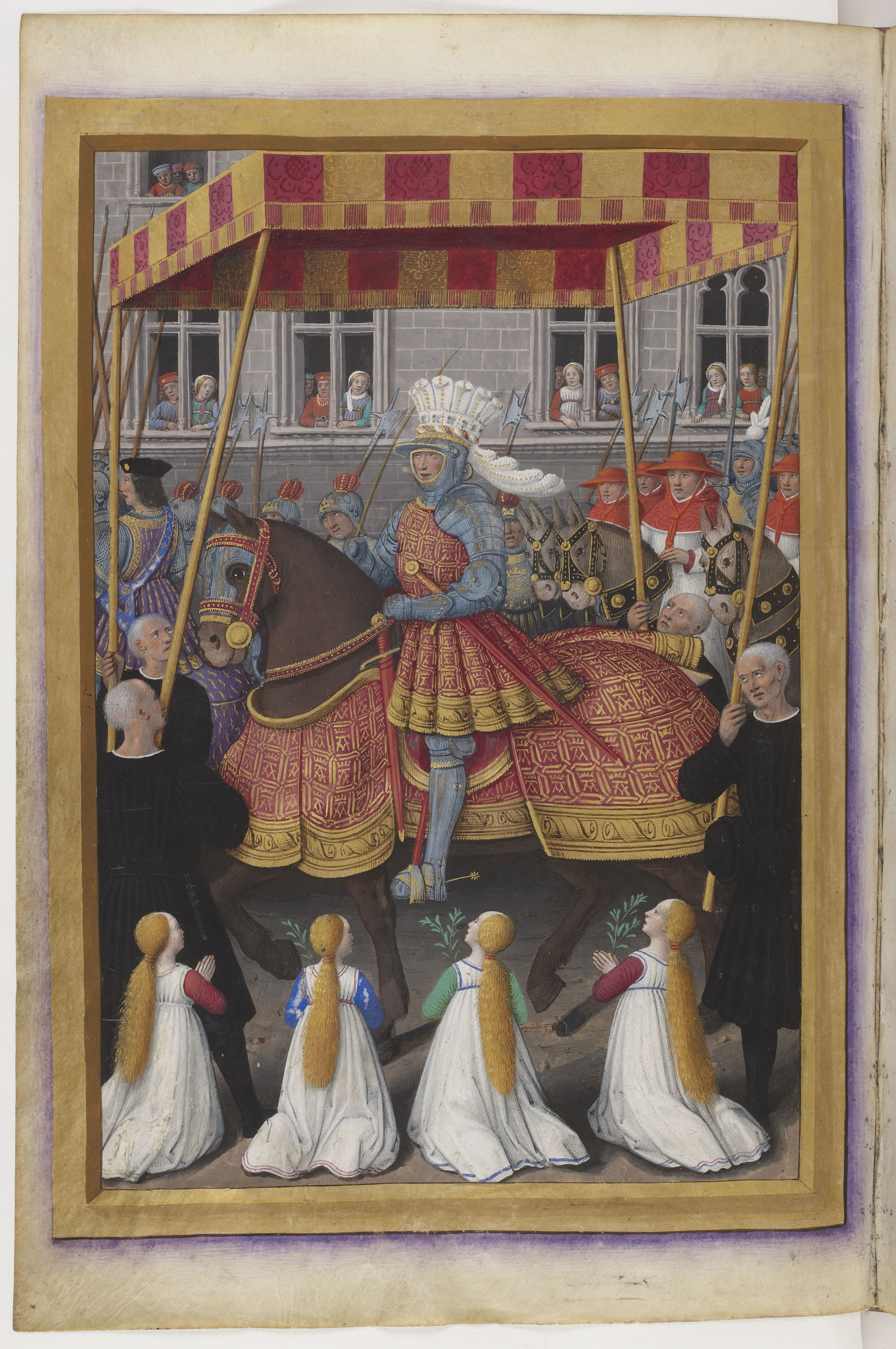
Victorious royal entry by King Louis XII of France into Genoa, after a siege. Miniature by Jean Bourdichon, c. 1508

A baldachin may also be used in formal processions, including royal entries, coronation or funeral processions, to signify the elite status of the individual it covers. The origins of such an emblematic use in Europe lay in the courts of the Neo-Assyrian state, adopted in Athens perhaps as early as the late seventh century BC, but relegated to the use of women by the late fifth century (compare parasol).

Such canopies might be made of anything from muslin to heavy brocade, or even constructed of less flexible materials, and are supported by poles, whether affixed to a carriage, or carried by people walking on each side. An Egyptian pharaoh, for example, was escorted both in life and in death by such a canopy of estate.

Francisco Franco, the ruler of Spain from 1939 to 1975, frequently walked under a baldachin after formally proclaiming Spain a monarchy—a privilege he appropriated as de facto regent for life.

In Spanish Holy Week processions the sculptures of Virgin Mary, shown as Queen of Sorrow, use to go on their floats under canopies with embroideries made with gold or silver yarn.

== Surname Baldacchino ==
The surname Baldacchino comes from the artisans who used to make the Baldachin. The surname is found mainly in the islands of Malta and Sicily, particularly in Agrigento and Naro.

== Gallery ==
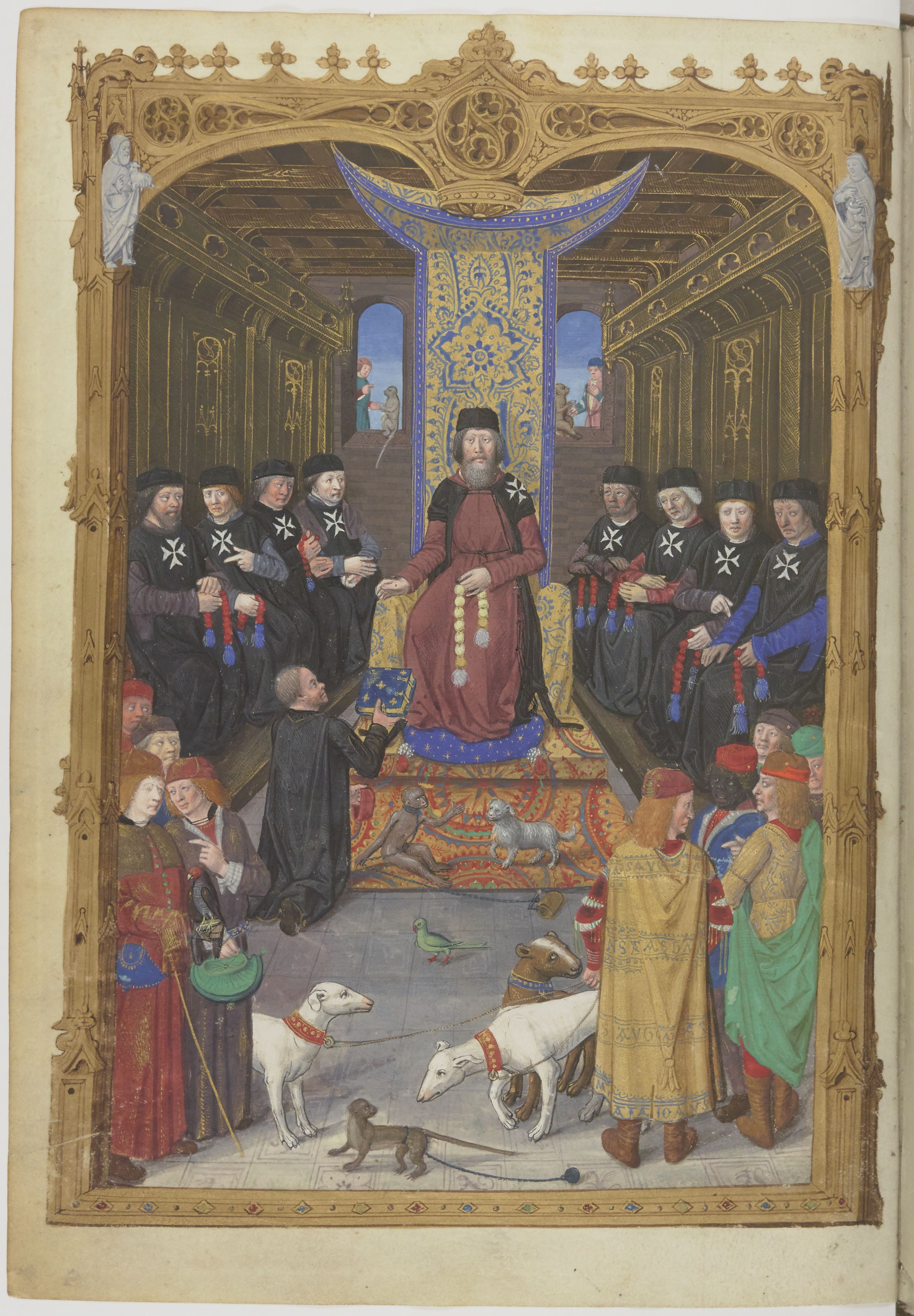
The Grand Master of the Knights Hospitaller at Rhodes under a canopy of estate, on a dais: there is a cushion under his feet.

Lady Margaret Beaufort, Queen Mother, at prayer, by an anonymous artist, about 1500

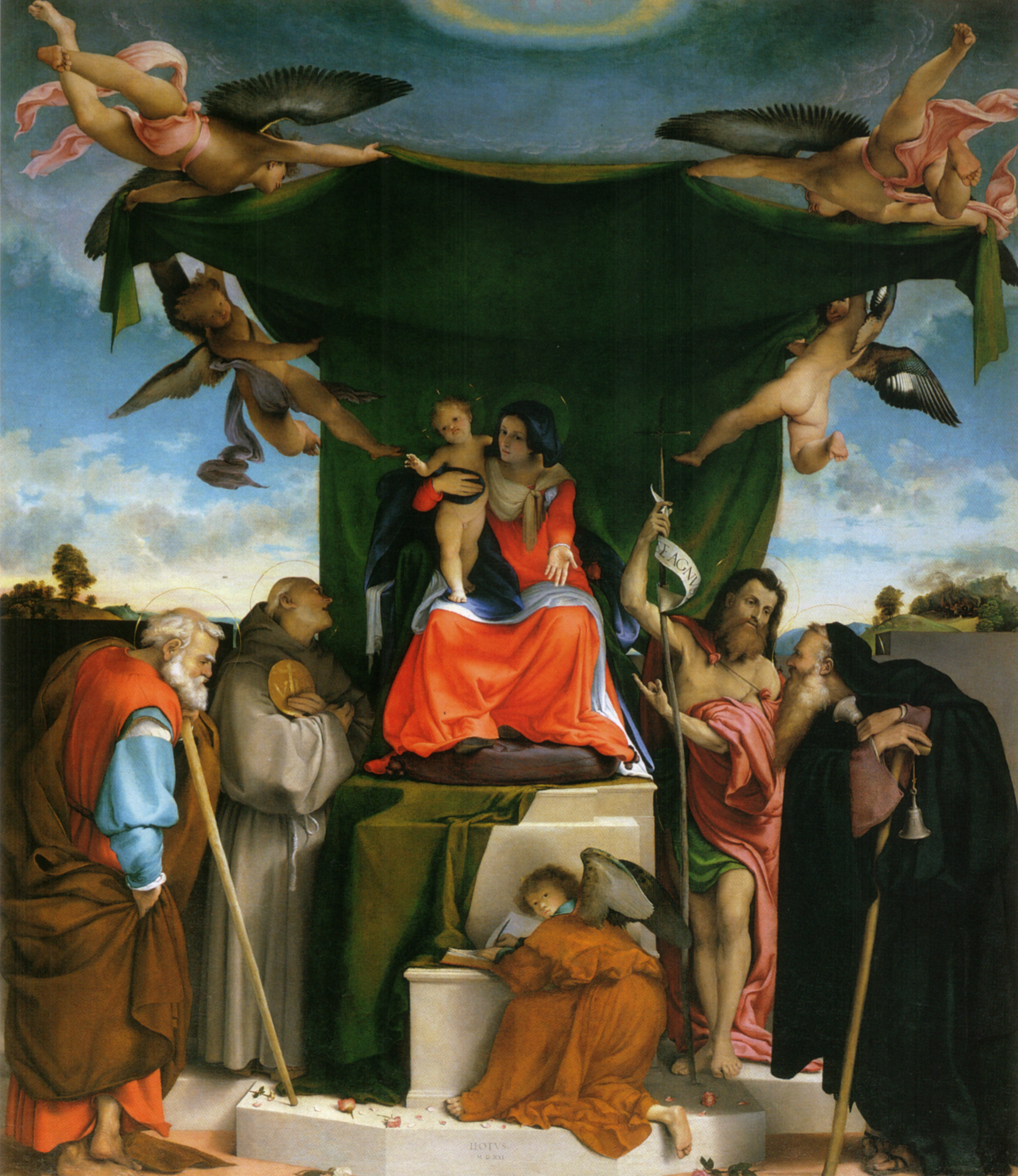
A cloth of honour held over the Virgin by angels, in an altarpiece by Lorenzo Lotto

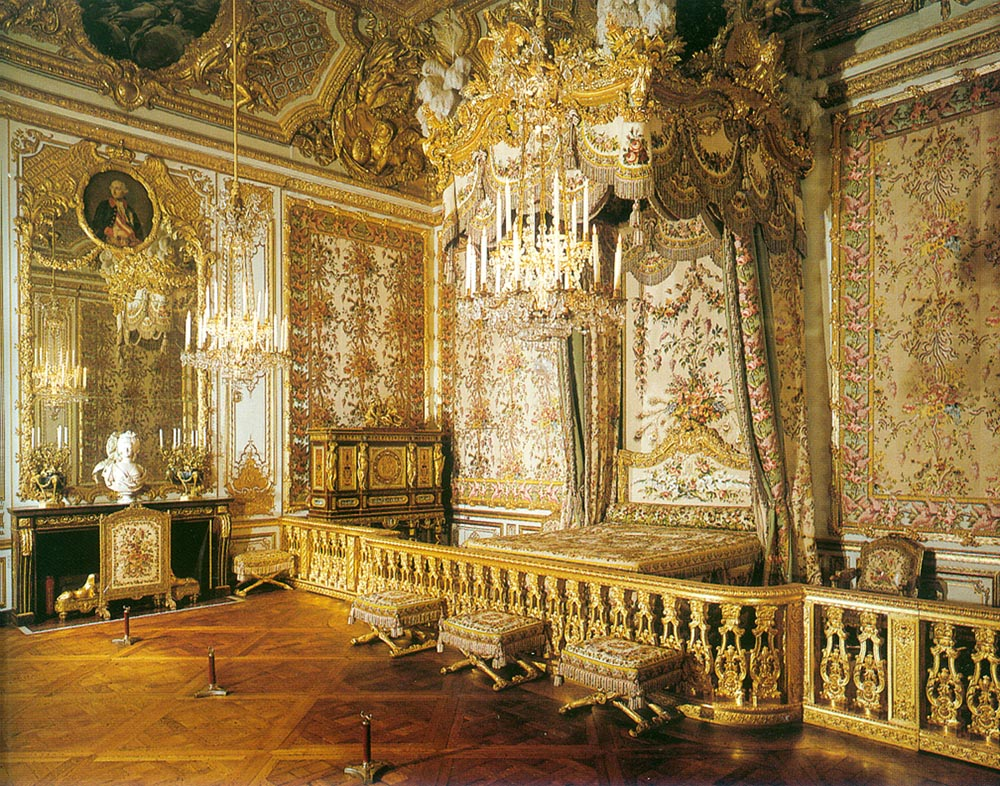
At Versailles, the Chambre de la Reine features the centrally-placed state bed delivered for Queen Maria Leszczinska.

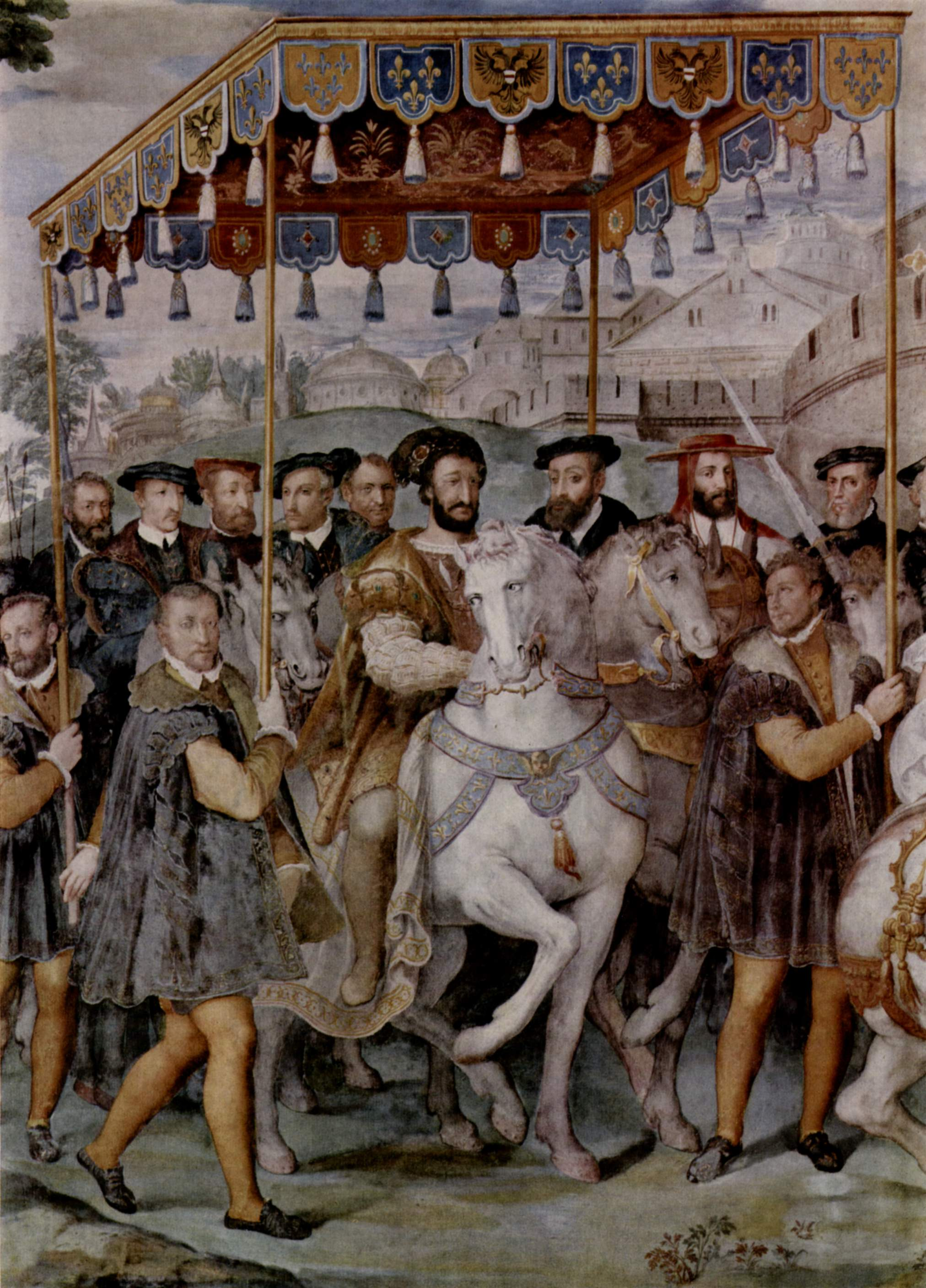
King Francis I of France, Charles V, and Cardinal Alessandro Farnese

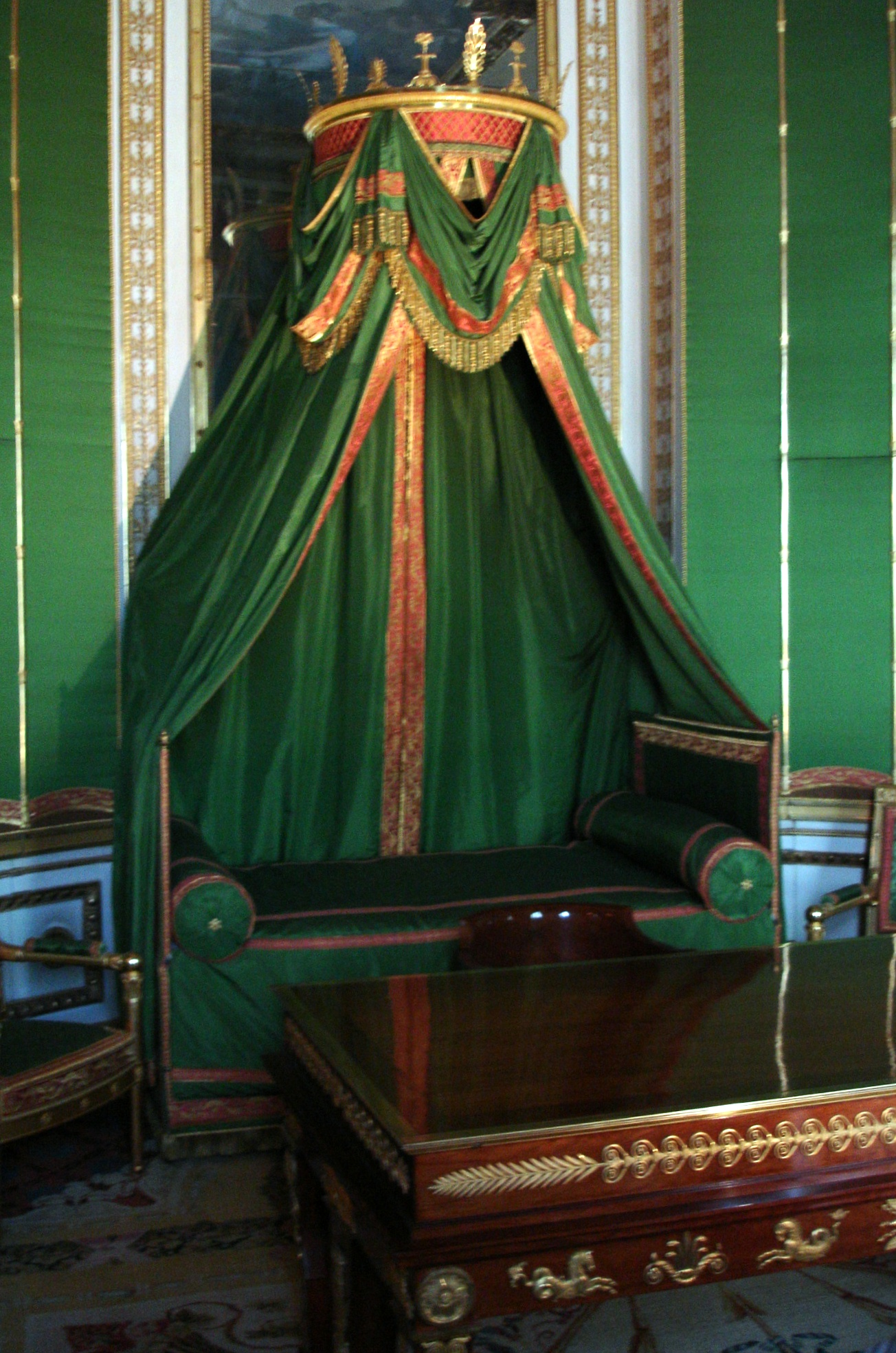
A baldachin in Empire style above a daybed

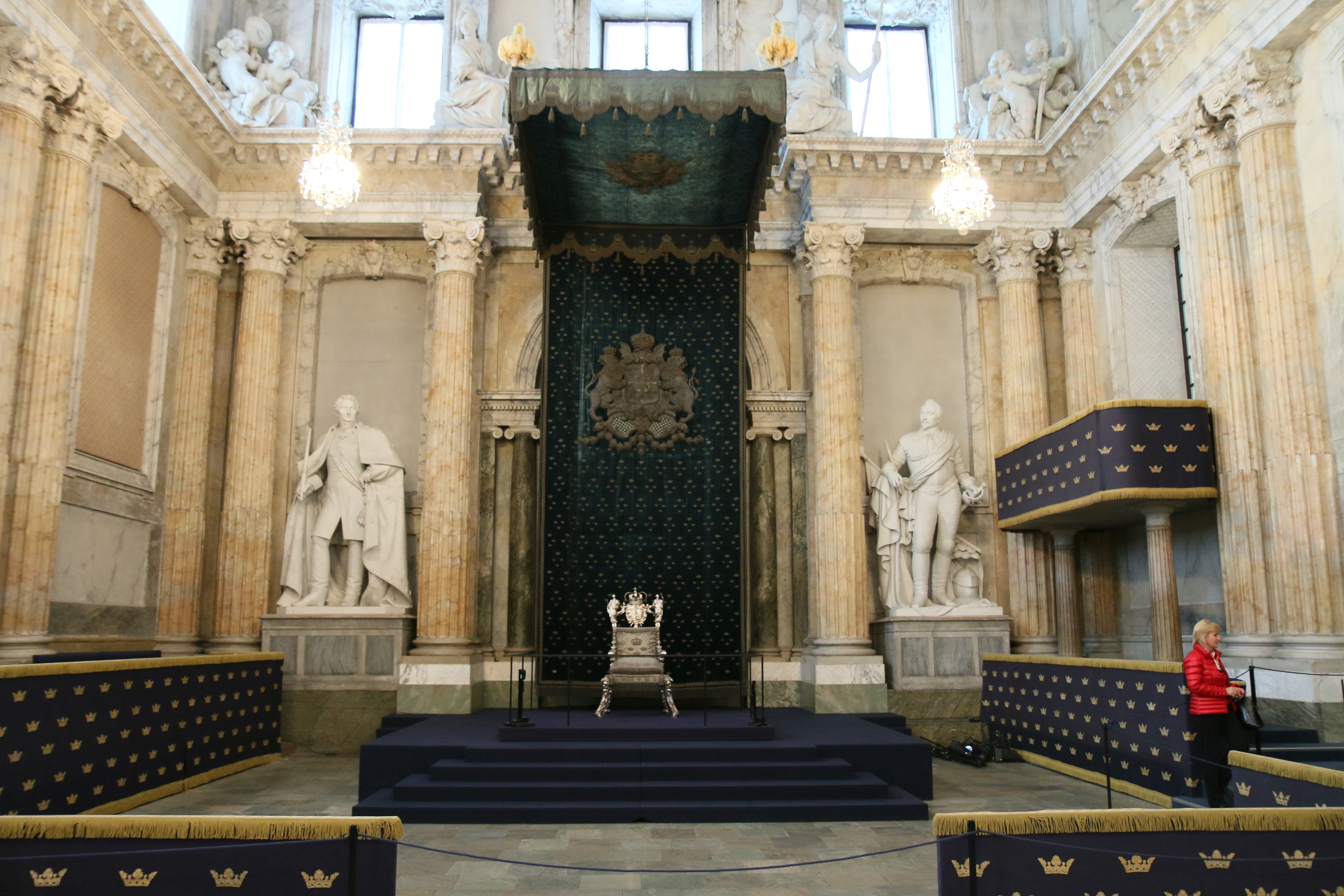
Baldachin covering the Silver Throne in the Hall of State of Stockholm Palace, Sweden

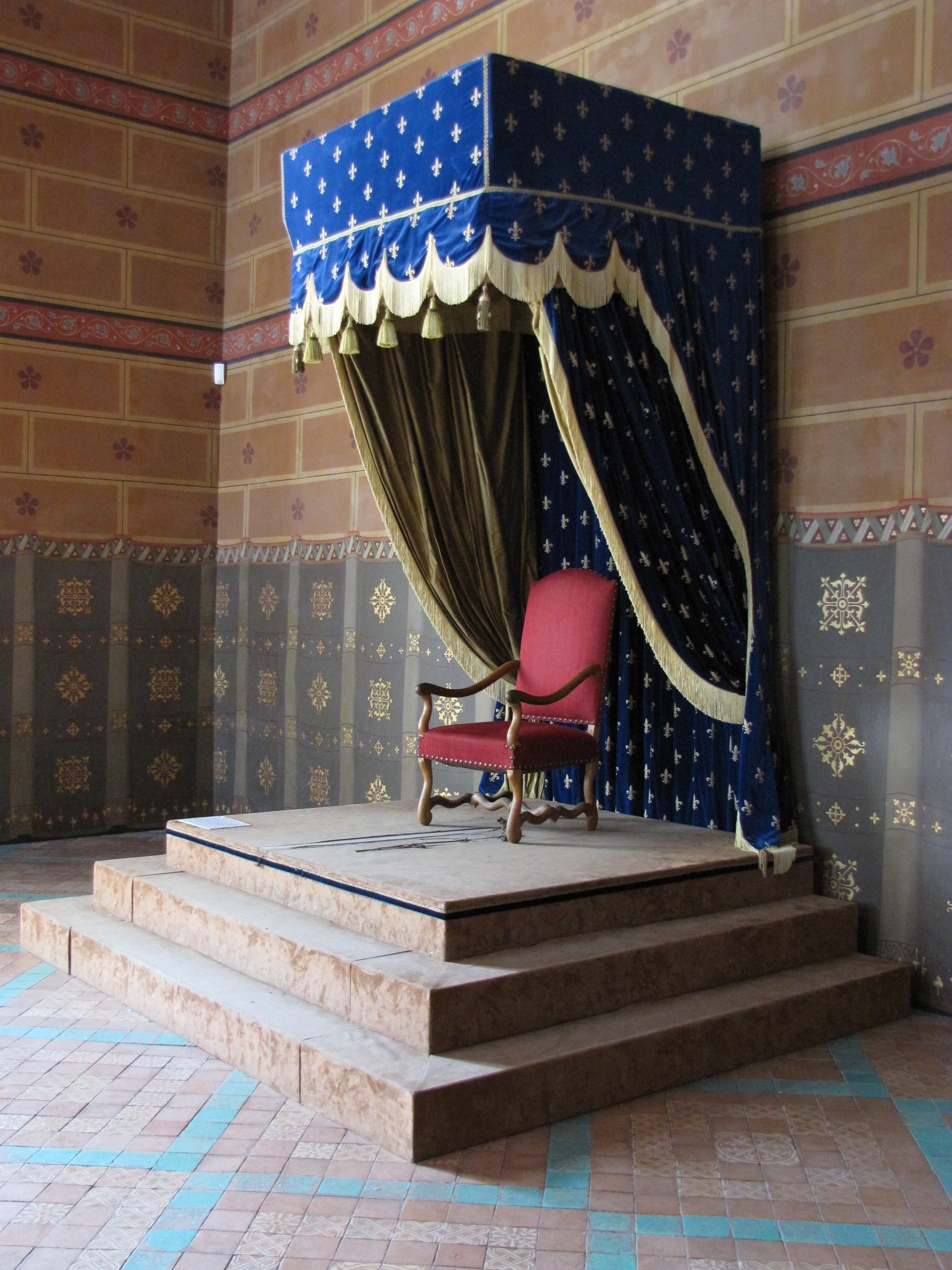
Baldachin in blue decorated with fleurs-de-lys in the former royal residence of Château de Blois

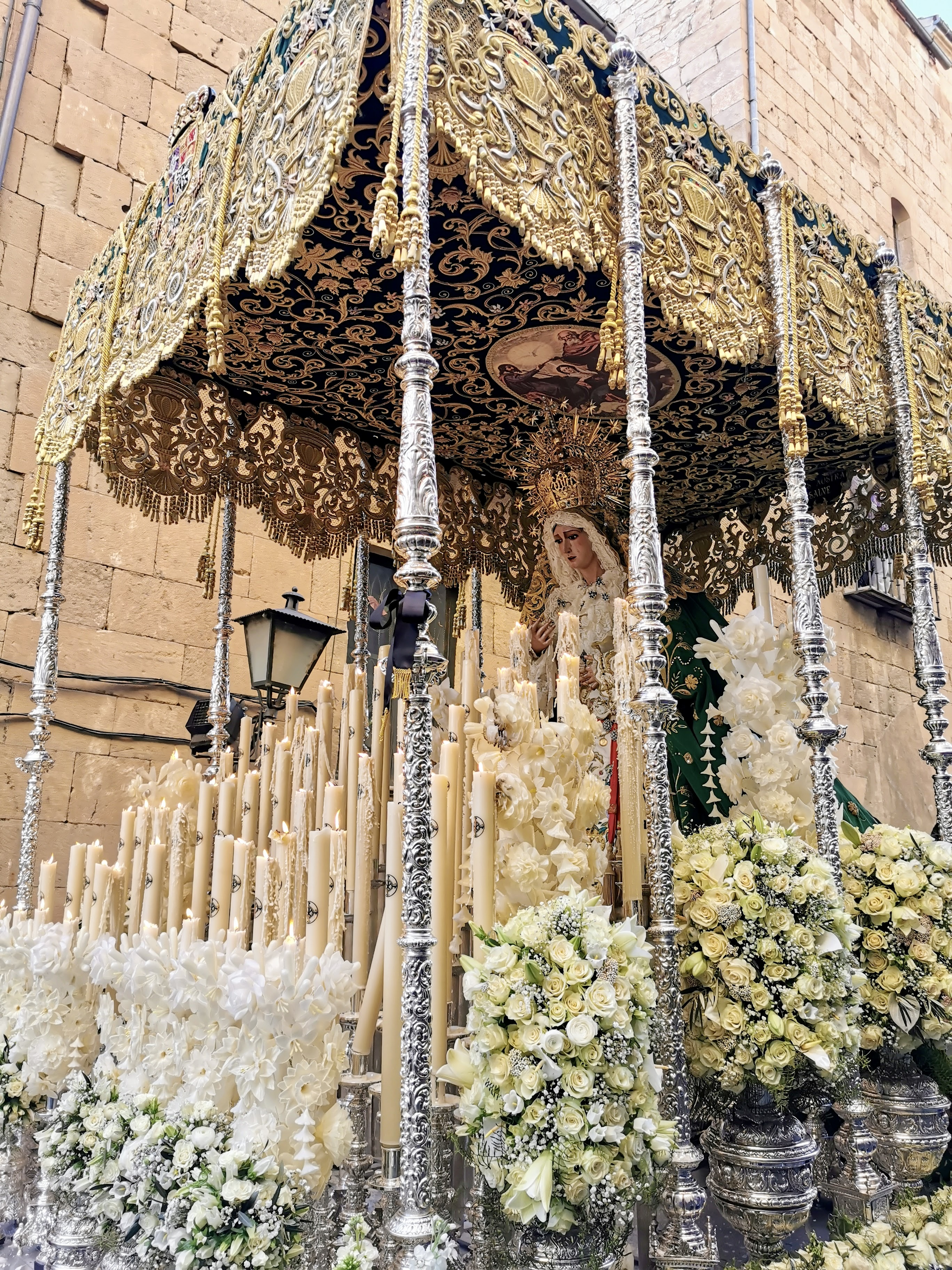
Our Lady of Hope under canopy. Holy Week in Salamanca, Spain

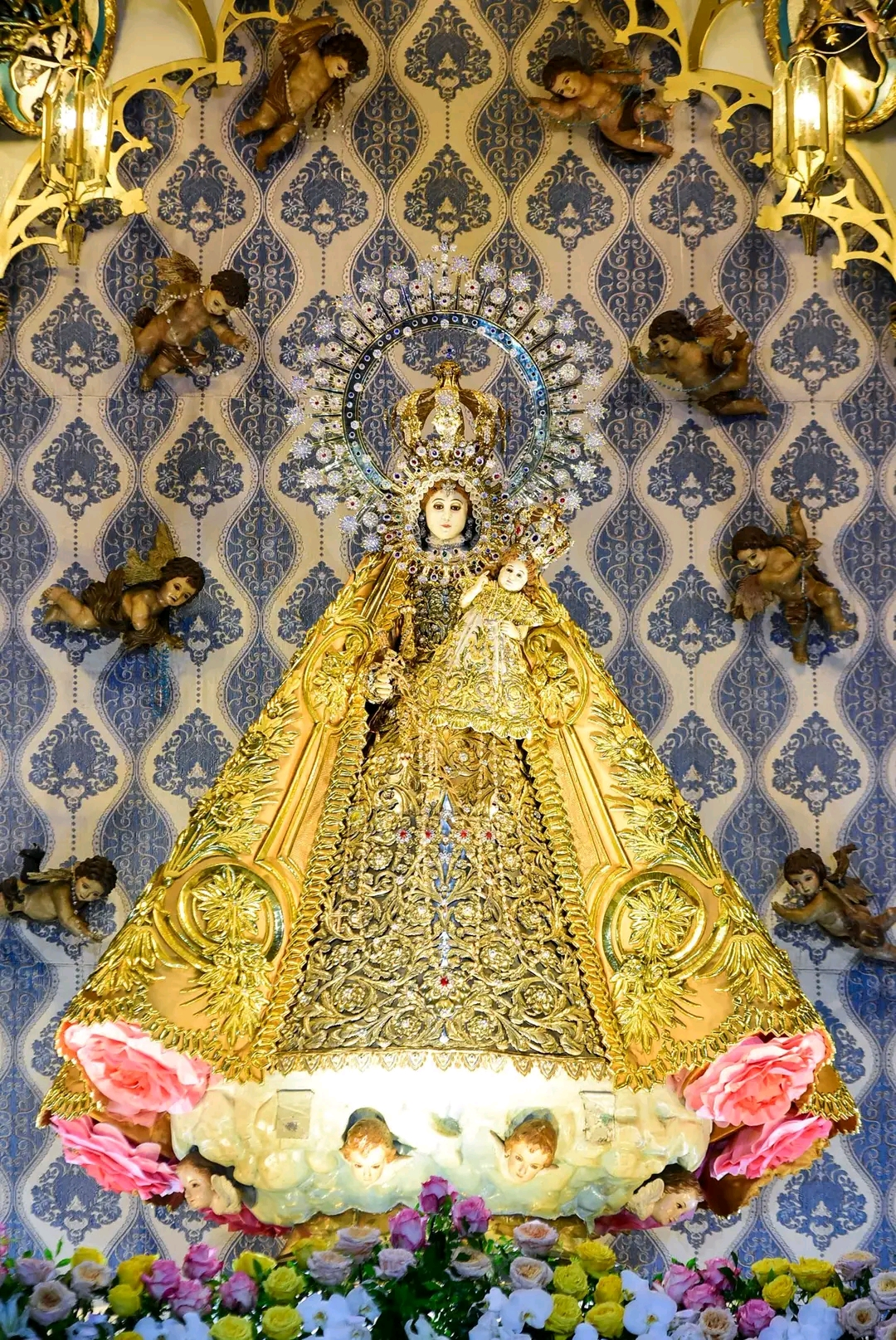
Our Lady of La Naval de Manila during the enthronement rites at Santo Domingo Church

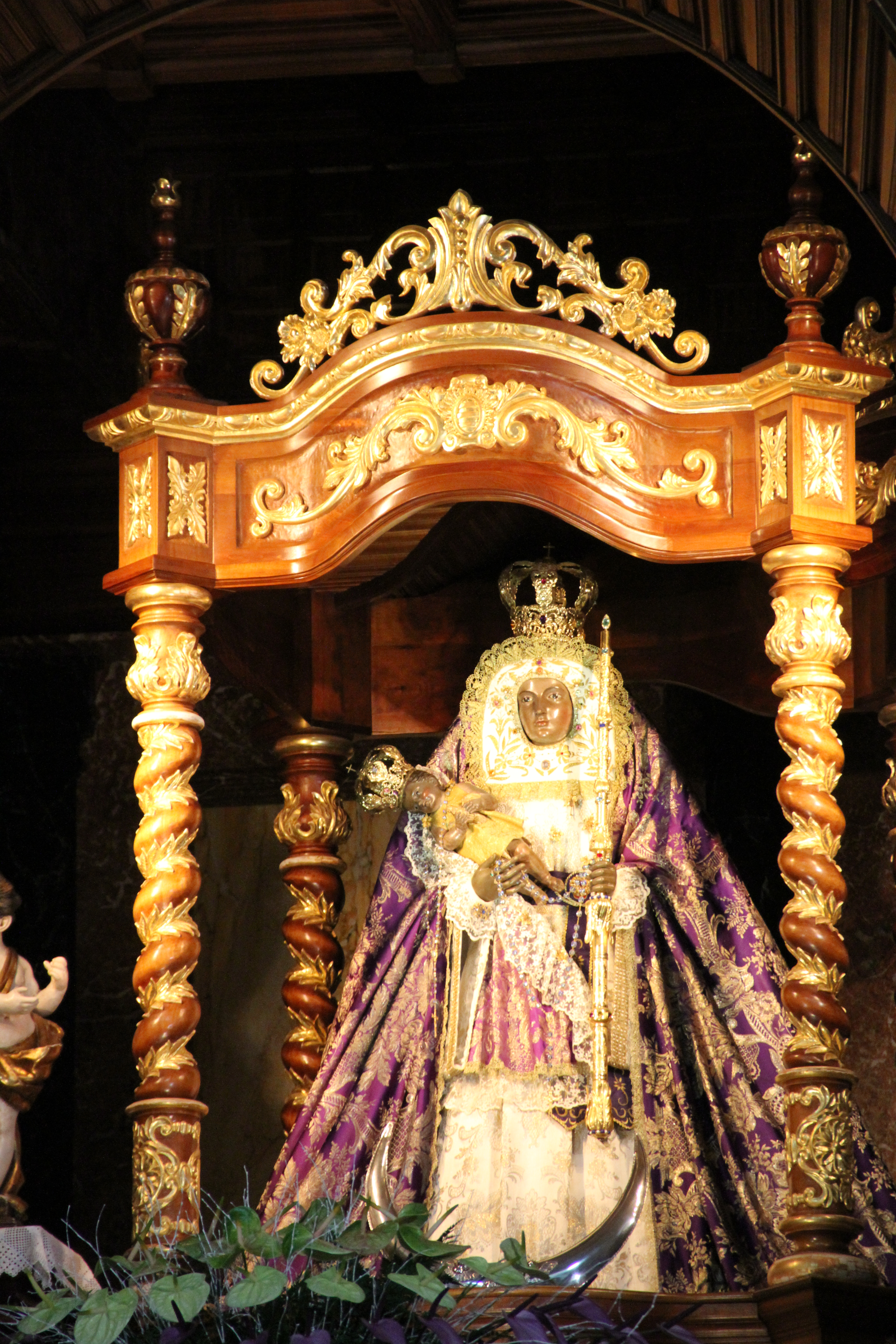
Baldachin of the Virgin of Candelaria, patron saint of Canary Islands, Spain. It is inspired by Bernini's Baldachin from the Vatican.

== See also ==
- Ciborium
- Monopteros
- Aedicule
- Gazebo
- Symbolism of domes
