= Roman Catholic Diocese of Malindi =

Roman Catholic diocese in Kenya

Coordinates: 3.2088°S 40.1157°E

Diocese of Malindi Dioecesis Malindiensis Dayosisi ya Malindi

Location
- Country: Kenya
- Metropolitan: Mombasa

Statistics
- Area: 33,254 km^{2} (12,839 sq mi)
- Population: Total; Catholics: (as of 2004); 539,000; 21,800 (4%)

Information
- Sui iuris church: Latin Church
- Rite: Roman Rite
- Established: 2 June 2000
- Cathedral: Cathedral of St Anthony in Malindi

Current leadership
- Pope: Leo XIV
- Bishop: Willybard Kitogho Lagho

The Roman Catholic Diocese of Malindi (Latin: Malindien(sis)) is a diocese located in the city of Malindi in the ecclesiastical province of Mombasa in Kenya.

== History ==
- June 2, 2000: Established as Diocese of Malindi from the Diocese of Garissa and Metropolitan Archdiocese of Mombasa.

== Ordinaries ==
- Bishops of Malindi (Roman rite)
  - Bishop Francis Baldacchino (2 Jun 2000 – 9 Oct 2009; died)
  - Bishop Emanuel Barbara (8 July 2011 – 5 January 2018; died)
  - Bishop Willybard Kitogho Lagho (28 December 2020 – )

== See also ==
- Roman Catholicism in Kenya
- Kenya Conference of Catholic Bishops

== Sources ==
- GCatholic.org
