= Baldacchino (surname) =

Baldacchino is a surname. Notable people with the surname include:

- Clifford Gatt Baldacchino (born 1988), Maltese footballer
- Francis Baldacchino (1937–2009), Kenyan Roman Catholic bishop
- Godfrey Baldacchino (born 1960), Maltese-Canadian social scientist
- Joseph Baldacchino (1894–1974), Maltese archaeologist
- Peter Baldacchino (born 1960), Maltese-born American Roman Catholic bishop
- Romilda Baldacchino Zarb, Maltese politician
- Ruth Baldacchino, (born 1979), LGBT rights activist
- Ryan Baldacchino (born 1981), English footballer
