= Kivuva =

Kivuva is a Kenyan surname. Notable people with the surname include:

- Jackson Kivuva (born 1989), Kenyan middle-distance runner
- Martin Kivuva Musonde (born 1952), Kenyan Roman Catholic Archbishop
