= Darmanin =

Darmanin is a surname. Notable people include:

- Edward Darmanin (born 1945), Maltese footballer
- Gérald Darmanin, (born 1982) French politician, Minister of the Interior
- Lisa Darmanin (politician), Australian politician
- Lisa Darmanin (sailor) (born 1991), Australian sailor
- Paul Darmanin (born 1940), Maltese catholic prelate; Bishop of Garissa, Kenya
- Saviour Darmanin (born 1977), Maltese footballer
