= John Joseph Njenga =

Roman Catholic archbishop (1928–2018)

John Joseph Njenga Most Reverend
- Archbishop Emeritus of Mombasa
- Church: Roman Catholic Church
- Archdiocese: Mombasa
- Metropolis: Mombasa
- See: Mombasa
- Appointed: 21 May 1990
- Installed: 21 May 1990
- Term ended: 1 April 2005
- Predecessor: Nicodemus Kirima
- Successor: Boniface Lele

Orders
- Ordination: 17 February 1957 by John Joseph McCarthy
- Consecration: 22 November 1970 by Pierluigi Sartorelli

Personal details
- Born: John Joseph Njenga; December 25, 1928 Tigoni, Kiambu County, Kenya
- Died: 4 November 2018 (aged 89) Mater Misericordiae Hospital, Nairobi, Kenya
- Denomination: Catholic Church

Ordination history of John Joseph Njenga
History
Priestly ordination
- Ordained by: John Joseph McCarthy
- Date: 17 February 1957

John Joseph Njenga (25 December 1928 – 4 November 2018) was a Roman Catholic prelate who was the Archbishop of the Roman Catholic Archdiocese of Mombasa from 1990 until his age-related retirement in 2005. Before that, from 1988 until 1990, he was the Bishop of Mombasa before the diocese was elevated to an archdiocese. Prior to Mombasa, he served as the Bishop of the Roman Catholic Diocese of Eldoret from 1970 until 1988. He was appointed bishop on 19 October 1970 by Pope Paul VI. He died on 4 November 2018, as the Archbishop Emeritus of Mombasa, Kenya, one month shy of his 90th birthday.

== Background and education ==
He was born on 25 December 1928 to Peter Kimani and Maria Wanjiru in Tigoni, Kiambu County, Kenya. He attended primary school in his home area. He completed secondary school at Mang'u High School in Kiambu County. He studied both philosophy and theology at a seminary at Kibosho, Kilimanjaro Region in Tanzania, before he was ordained a priest in 1957.

Later, he graduated with a master's degree in social studies from the University of London and with a Doctor of Canon Law degree from the Pontifical Urban University in Rome, Italy.

== Priest ==
He was ordained priest of Nairobi, Kenya on 17 February 1957, by Archbishop John Joseph McCarthy, C.S.Sp., Archbishop of Nairobi at Lioki Catholic Church, in the Archdiocese of Nairobi. He served in that capacity until 19 October 1970.

As a priest, he served in various roles both inside and outside his diocese including as:

- Priest at Queen of Apostles Seminary in Nairobi Archdiocese from where he served from 1957 until 1959.
- Member of the Catholic Secretariat in the Department of the Lay Apostolate
- First African Parish Priest at Our Lady of Visitation Church (OLVC) in Makadara, Nairobi starting in 1964.
- He was selected as a Monsignor, being the first indigenous Kenyan priest to be awarded the title.
- Later, he was appointed as the Education Secretary for the Archdiocese of Nairobi.
- He was the lead negotiator with the Central Kenyan Government in the negotiations of the Education Act of 1968 which approved the teaching of religion in schools.
- He negotiated for the creation of the St. Paul's Chaplaincy through a partnership between the Catholic Church and the University of Nairobi.

== Bishop ==
Bishop Njenga was appointed bishop and selected to head the Catholic Diocese of Eldoret on 4 October 1970. He was ordained and installed at Eldoret, Diocese of Eldoret, on 22 November 1970 by the hands of Archbishop Pierluigi Sartorelli, Titular Archbishop of Semina assisted by Archbishop Maurice Michael Otunga, Coadjutor Archbishop of Nairobi, Kenya & Titular Archbishop of Polymartium and Bishop Caesar Gatimu, Bishop of Nyeri.

On 25 October 1988, after 18 years at Eldoret, he was appointed Bishop of the Catholi Diocese of Mombasa. He took possession of the diocese on 12 February 1989. On 21 May 1990, The Holy Father John Paul II, elevated the diocese of Mombasa to an archdiocese and elevated the bishop there (John Joseph Njenga) to an archbishop. On 1 April 2005, the age-related application for retirement from pastoral services submitted by Archbishop John Joseph Njenga, was accepted by the Holy See. Archbishop Boniface Lele was appointed to replace him as the Metropolitan Archbishop of Mombasa.

Before his retirement Bishop Njenga also served as the Secretary General of the Kenya Episcopal Conference (KEC) currently the Kenya Conference of Catholic Bishops (KCCB) from 1967 until 1970. He also served as chairman of the same organisation from 1976 until 1982.

He then relocated to the Queen of Apostles Seminary Rauraka, in Ruaraka, Archdiocese of Nairobi. While there, he continued to serve the Church through Archbishop Njenga Foundation, a charitable Organization for the vulnerable children. He died on 4 November 2018 at the Mater Misericordiae Hospital in Nairobi, Kenya's capital city. He was 89 years old.

== See also ==
- Catholic Church in Kenya

== Succession table ==
Catholic Church titles
| Preceded by Joseph Brendan Houlihan (29 January 1954 - 19 October 1970) | Bishop of Eldoret (19 October 1970 - 25 October 1988) | Succeeded by Cornelius Kipng'eno Arap Korir |
| Preceded by Nicodemus Kirima (27 February 1978 - 12 March 1988) | Bishop of Mombasa (25 October 1988 - 21 May 1990) | Succeeded by None (Diocese elevated) |
| Preceded by None (Archdiocese created) | Archbishop of Mombasa (21 May 1990 - 1 April 2005) | Succeeded by Boniface Lele |
