= Emanuel Barbara =

His Excellency Emanuel Barbara O.F.M. Cap.
- Bishop of Malindi
- Church: Roman Catholic
- Diocese: Malindi
- Appointed: 9 July 2011
- Installed: 1 October 2011
- Predecessor: Francis Baldacchino

Orders
- Ordination: 20 July 1974
- Consecration: 9 July 2011 by John Cardinal Njue
- Rank: Bishop

Personal details
- Born: 27 October 1949 Gzira, Malta
- Died: 5 January 2018 (aged 68)

Styles of Emanuel Barbara
- Reference style: The Right Reverend
- Spoken style: My Lord
- Religious style: Bishop
- Posthumous style: not applicable

Emanuel Barbara OFM Cap (27 October 1949 – 5 January 2018) was a Maltese bishop who served as the Bishop of Malindi in Kenya.

Barbara was born in Gzira Malta on 27 October 1949. He joined the Order of Friars Minor Capuchin and took his solemn profession on 26 September 1966. In 1973 he was ordained to the diaconate and a year later on July 20 he was ordained as a priest. Until 2008 he served as a priest in the Diocese of Malindi. He also served as Provincial Minister of the Maltese Capuchin Province. In 2011 Pope Benedict XVI appointed him bishop of Malindi in Kenya and on 1 October 2011 he was consecrated by Cardinal John Njue. On 1 November 2013 Barbara was appointed Apostolic Administrator of the Archdiocese of Mombasa after the see fell vacant because of the resignation of Archbishop Boniface Lele.
