= Boniface Lele =

Kenyan Roman Catholic prelate (1947–2014)

The Most Reverend Boniface Lele
- Archbishop Emeritus of Mombasa, Kenya (Deceased)
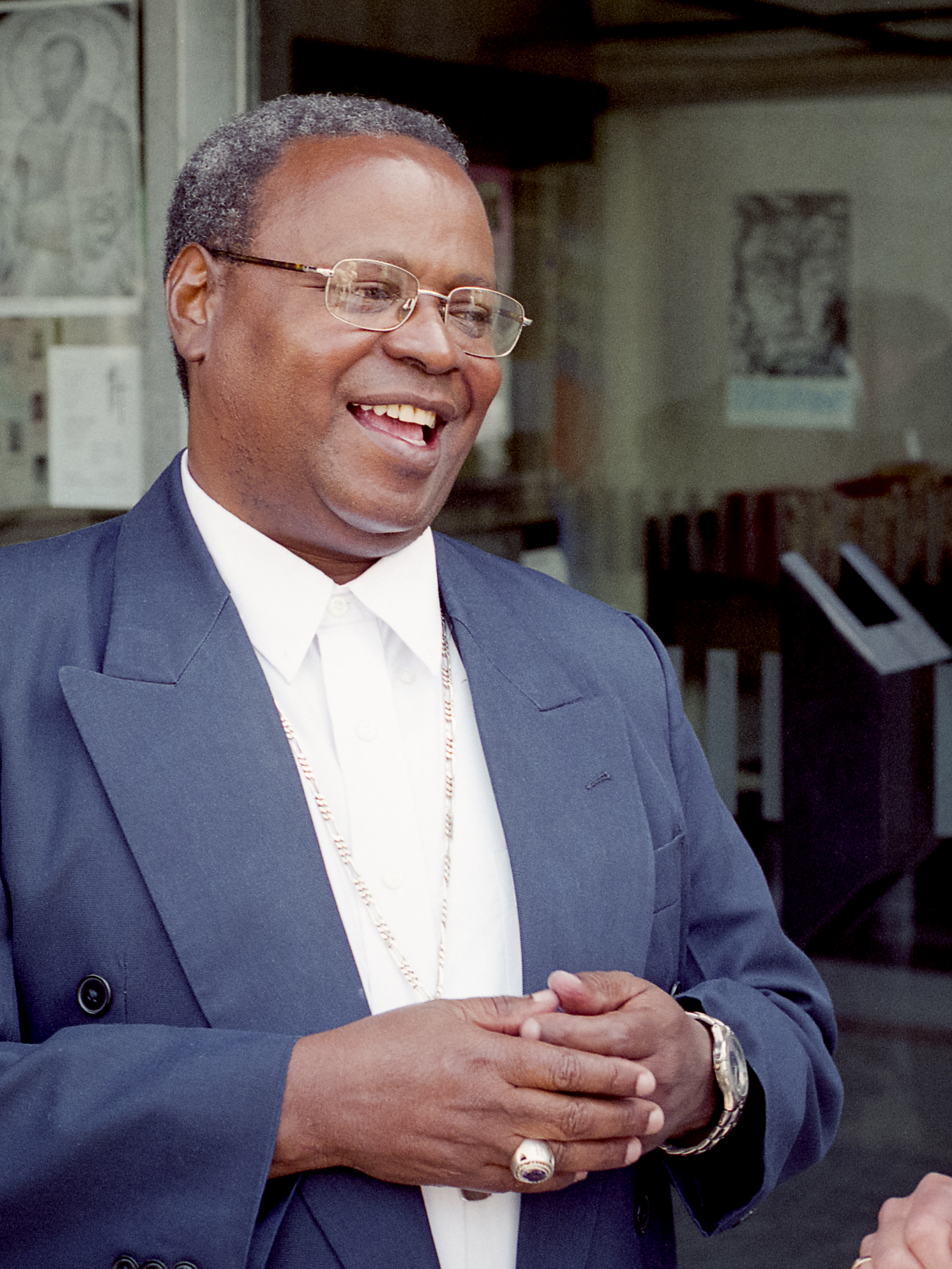
- Archbishop Boniface Lele in 2007
- Church: Catholic Church
- Archdiocese: Roman Catholic Archdiocese of Mombasa
- See: Mombasa
- Appointed: 1 April 2005
- Installed: 1 April 2005
- Term ended: 1 November 2013
- Predecessor: John Joseph Njenga
- Successor: Martin Kivuva Musonde
- Other post: Bishop of Kitui (2 November 1995 - 1 April 2005)

Orders
- Ordination: 8 December 1974
- Consecration: 2 February 1996 by Jozef Cardinal Tomko
- Rank: Bishop

Personal details
- Born: Boniface Lele; April 14, 1947 Kyangwithya, Diocese of Kitui, Kitui County, Kenya
- Died: 9 April 2014 (aged 66) Hospital in Mombasa, Kenya

Styles of Boniface Lele
- Reference style: Your Grace; The Most Reverend
- Spoken style: His Grace
- Religious style: Archbishop

Boniface Lele (14 April 1947 – 9 April 2014) was a Roman Catholic prelate in Kenya. He was the Archbishop of the Roman Catholic Archdiocese of Mombasa from 2005 until his health-related resignation in 2013. Before that, from 1995 until 2005, he was the Bishop of the Roman Catholic Diocese of Kitui, a Suffragan diocese of Mombasa. He died on 9 April 2014 as Archbishop Emeritus of Mombasa, Kenya. He was 66 years, one week shy of his 67th birthday.

== Early life ==
Boniface Lele was born on 14 April 1947 at Kitui Diocese in the city of Kyangwithya located in Kitui County, Kenya. After studying philosophy and theology, he was ordained a priest in December 1974.

== Priest ==
He was ordained a priest of the Roman Catholic Diocese of Kitui on 8 December 1974. He served in that capacity until 2 November 1995.

== Bishop ==
Father Boniface Lele was named bishop of the Roman Catholic Diocese of Kitui, Kenya, on 2 November 1995. He was consecrated and installed at Kitui on 2 February 1996 by the hands of Jozef Cardinal Tomko, Cardinal-Priest of Santa Sabina assisted by Bishop William Dunne, Prefect of Kitui and Maurice Michael Otunga, Archbishop of Nairobi.

On 1 April 2005, he was appointed Archbishop of Mombasa, Kenya. He succeeded Archbishop John Joseph Njenga who retired the same day. He served there until 1 November 2013, when he resigned and became the Archbishop Emeritus of Mombasa, Kenya for health reasons.

He died on 9 April 2014, from a heart attack at the age of 66, five days before his 67th birthday. He was buried on 22 April 2014 inside a grotto carved out of a coral rock beneath the Holy Ghost Cathedral Mombasa in Mombasa. The chief celebrant of the final requiem mass was John Cardinal Njue, Archbishop of Nairobi and chairman of the Kenya Conference of Catholic Bishops (KCCB).

== See also ==
- Roman Catholicism in Kenya

== Succession table ==
Catholic Church titles
| Preceded by William Dunne (19 October 1956 - 2 November 1995) | Bishop of Kitui (2 November 1995 - 1 April 2005) | Succeeded by Anthony Muheria |
| Preceded by John Joseph Njenga (25 October 1988 - 1 April 2005) | Archbishop of Mombasa (1 April 2005 - 1 November 2013) | Succeeded by Martin Kivuva Musonde |
