= Paul Darmanin =

Maltese Catholic Bishop (1940–2023)

His Excellency Paul Darmanin O.F.M. Cap.
- Bishop Emeritus of Garissa
- Archdiocese: Mombasa
- Appointed: 3 February 1984
- Term ended: 8 December 2015
- Predecessor: Leo Joseph White
- Successor: Joseph Alessandro

Orders
- Ordination: 26 March 1966
- Consecration: 3 June 1984 by Joseph Mercieca
- Rank: Bishop

Personal details
- Born: 6 November 1940 Santa Venera, Malta
- Died: 25 July 2023 (aged 82) Floriana, Malta

Paul Darmanin (6 November 1940 – 25 July 2023) was a Maltese Catholic prelate who served as the Bishop of Garissa in Kenya from 1984 to 2015.

Darmanin was born in Santa Venera, Malta on 6 November 1940. He entered the Order of Friars Minor Capuchin and was ordained to the priesthood on 26 March 1966. In 1984 Pope John Paul II appointed him as the Bishop of Garissa in Kenya. He was consecrated by the Archbishop of Malta Joseph Mercieca and co-consecrated by the Archbishop of Cardiff John Ward and Bishop Biagio Vittorio Terrinoni of Marsi.

Catholic Church titles
Preceded by Leo Joseph White	Bishop of Garissa; 1984–2015	Succeeded by Joseph Alessandro
