= Roman Catholic Diocese of Garissa =

Roman Catholic diocese in Kenya

Coordinates: 0.4519°S 39.6449°E

Diocese of Garissa Dioecesis Garissaënsis Jimbo la Garissa
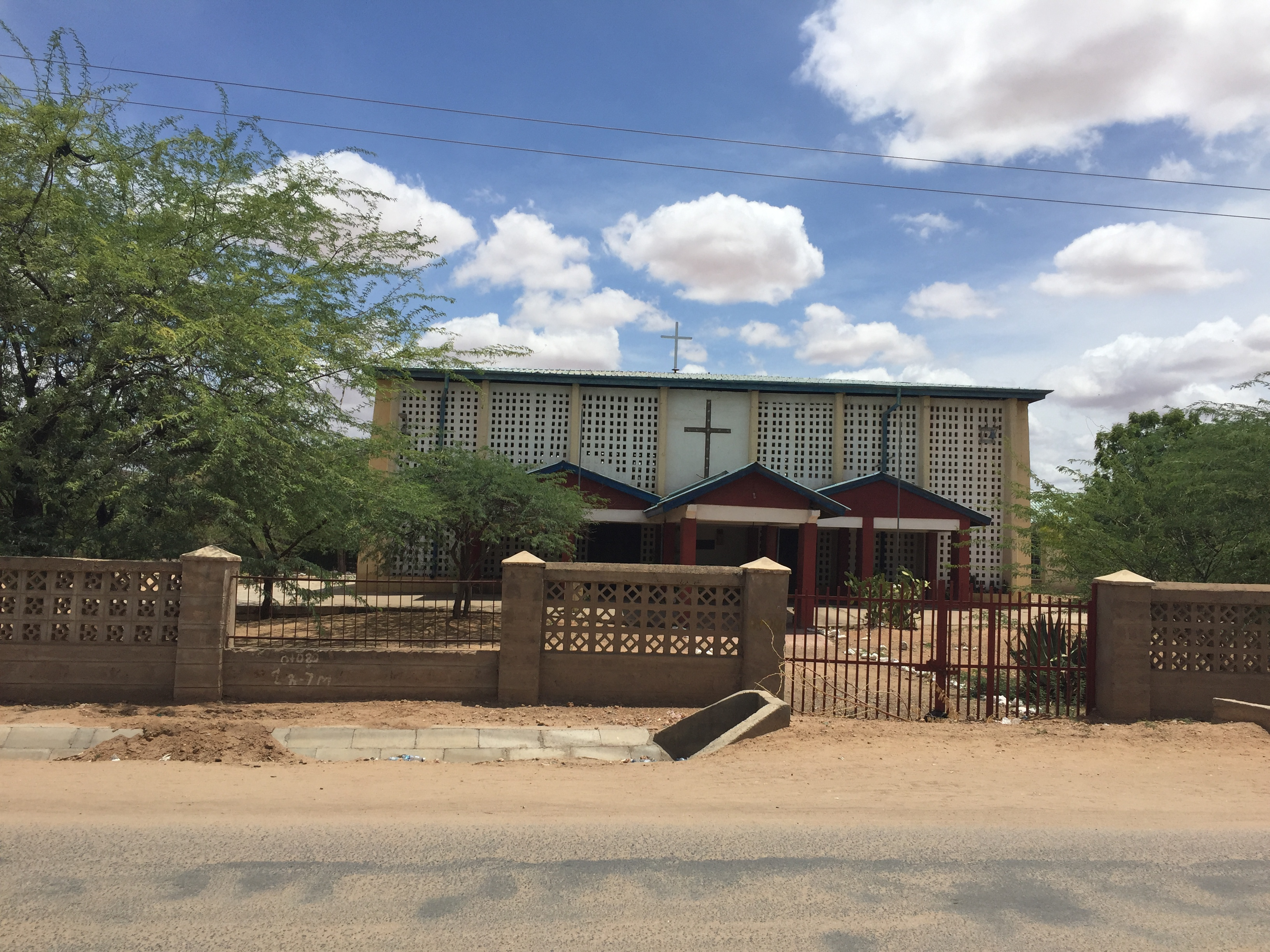
- Our Lady of Consolation Cathedral

Location
- Country: Kenya
- Ecclesiastical province: Mombasa
- Metropolitan: Mombasa

Statistics
- Area: 140,000 km^{2} (54,000 sq mi)
- Population: Total; Catholics: (as of 2006); 729,000; 6,690 (0.9%)

Information
- Rite: Latin Rite
- Cathedral: Our Lady of Consolation Cathedral in Garissa

Current leadership
- Pope: Francis
- Bishop: George Muthaka, OFMCap
- Metropolitan Archbishop: Martin Kivuva Musonde
- Bishops emeritus: Joseph Alessandro, OFMCap

The Roman Catholic Diocese of Garissa (Latin: Garissaën[sis]) is a diocese located in the city of Garissa. It is administered under the ecclesiastical province of Mombasa in Kenya.

== History ==
- December 9, 1976: Established as Apostolic Prefecture of Garissa from the Diocese of Mombasa and Diocese of Meru
- February 3, 1984: Promoted as Diocese of Garissa

== Bishops ==
- Prefects Apostolic of Garissa (Roman rite)
  - Fr. Leo White, OFMCap (December 9, 1976 – 1984)
- Bishops of Garissa (Roman rite)
  - Bishop Paul Darmanin, OFMCap (February 3, 1984 - 9 Dec 2015)
  - Bishop Joseph Alessandro, OFMCap (9 Dec 2015 - 17 Feb 2022)
  - Bishop George Muthaka, OFMCap (17 Feb 2022–present)

=== Coadjutor Bishop ===
- Joseph Alessandro, OFMCap (2012-2015)

== See also ==
- Roman Catholicism in Kenya

== Sources ==
- GCatholic.org
- Catholic Hierarchy
- Kenya Conference of Catholic Bishops
- Archdiocese of Mombasa
