= Ruth Baldacchino =

LGBT and intersex activist

- Occupations: Former ILGA Co-Secretary General; Senior Program Officer - Intersex Human Rights Find at Astraea Lesbian Foundation for Justice
- Known for: LGBT rights
- Website: ruthbaldacchino.com

Ruth Baldacchino is a Maltese activist, academic and human rights advocate specialising in LGBTQI+ rights, feminist and queer governance, and social justice. They have played a leading role in national and international law and policy reform, including contributing to Malta's Gender Identity, Gender Expression and Sex Characteristics Act (2015). From 2014 to 2019, they served as Co-Secretary General of ILGA World, and were also Associate Director of Programs at the Astraea Lesbian Foundation for Justice, overseeing the Intersex Human Rights Fund.

== Education and Academic Career ==
Baldacchino studied Sociology at the University of Malta, graduating with a Bachelor of Arts (Honours) and minor in Communication Studies. They went on to complete a Master's degree in Women's Studies at University College Dublin, a programme shaped by the work of Ailbhe Smyth, founding head of the Women's Education, Research and Resource Centre (WERRC).

At the University of Malta, Ruth has served as a visiting lecturer in the Department of Sociology, where they introduced and taught courses in Queer Studies.

Baldacchino is currently pursuing a PhD in Social Justice at University College Dublin.

== Activism and Career ==
=== National Policy and Legislative Work (Malta) ===
Baldacchino worked in Malta’s Foundation for Educational Services (FES) within the Ministry for Education, where they contributed to community education initiatives, including the creation of Klabb 3–16, a national after-school programme combining educational support and childcare.

They later worked within the Ministry for Social Dialogue, Consumer Affairs and Civil Liberties, under Minister Helena Dalli (who subsequently became the first European Commissioner for Equality). As part of this role, Baldacchino authored the White Paper on the establishment of a Human Rights and Equality Commission and co-led the consultation process that informed the drafting of the subsequent Equality Bill and Human Rights and Equality Commission Bill. These bills aimed to align Malta’s legal framework with European Union equality directives and the Paris Principles of the United Nations. Baldacchino has also contributed to national strategies on migration and integration as well as anti-discrimination frameworks.

They were directly involved in the drafting of several landmark reforms, including the Gender Identity, Gender Expression and Sex Characteristics Act (2015), the first law worldwide to prohibit non-consensual, medically unnecessary interventions on intersex people and to outlaw discrimination on the grounds of gender identity, gender expression and sex characteristics. The legislation is widely regarded as one of the most progressive of its kind, guaranteeing the right to gender identity and expression through a self-determination model. It also established explicitly protections for intersex people, recognising right to bodily integrity and autonomy.

Baldacchino later described the Act as providing "freedom to an individual to develop, establish and express their gender, rather than having the State or the medical professionals deciding that. In other words, ... to be allowed to determine what identity fits ... best and how ... to embody that identity."

Since 2013, Baldacchino has served as a member of Malta's LGBTQI Consultative Council, an advisory body to the government on legislation and policy relating to LGBTQI equality, where they remain an active member.

In 2015, they also co-authored the national education policy on Trans, Gender Variant and Intersex Students in Schools, which introduced measures of inclusion and anti-bullying in the education system.

=== International Advocacy and Movement Building ===
Baldacchino has been active in LGBTQI movements since the early 2000s, beginning in 2002 with the MGRM: The Malta LGBTIQ Rights Movement, They later served on the boards of IGLYO, ILGA-Europe and ILGA World, contributing to the development of LGBTQI advocacy at regional and international levels. They also served as an internal auditor for TGEU - Transgender Europe, alongside Swedish politician, Ulrika Westerlund.

From 2014 to 2019, they were Co-Secretary General of ILGA World, the global federation of LGBTQI organisations, alongside Helen Kennedy.

They also co-facilitated and coordinated several of the International Intersex Fora and regional intersex meetings, strengthening global and regional intersex organising and advocacy platforms.

From 2015 to 2024, they worked at the Astraea Lesbian Foundation for Justice, serving as Senior Programme Officer and later Associate Director of Programs for the Intersex Human Rights Fund. In this role, they oversaw the first global fund dedicated to mobilising resources and funding intersex-led organisations and advocacy.

=== Academic and Educational Contributions ===
At the University of Malta, Baldacchino was a visiting lecturer in sociology, where they introduced courses in Queer Studies and supervised student research in gender and sexuality.

== Personal life ==
Baldacchino was born and raised in Siġġiewi, Malta. They identify as queer and use they/them pronouns.

== See also ==
- LGBTQ rights in Malta
- Astraea Lesbian Foundation for Justice
- ILGA World - International Lesbian, Gay, Bisexual, Trans and Intersex Association
- Helena Dalli
- Ailbhe Smyth
