= William Dunne =

Irish-born Roman Catholic priest and bishop

William Dunne SPS
- Bishop of Kitui
- Church: Catholic Church
- Diocese: Diocese of Kitui
- In office: 19 October 1956 – 2 November 1995
- Predecessor: Prefecture established
- Successor: Boniface Lele

Orders
- Ordination: 18 December 1944
- Consecration: 9 February 1964 by John Anthony Kyne

Personal details
- Born: 6 June 1920 Delvin, County Westmeath, Irish Republic
- Died: 31 March 2002 (aged 81)

William Dunne (born 6 June 1920, in Delvin; died 31 March 2002) was an Irish Roman Catholic priest who served as first bishop for the Diocese of Kitui, Kenya.

== Biography ==
He was born in Devlin, Ireland, in 1920. Dunne joined the Kiltegan Fathers and was ordained a priest in 1944. Dunne arrived in Kenya in 1951 when the Kiltegan Fathers took over Kitui from the Holy Ghost Fathers. He became Prefect Apostolic of Kitui in 1956. Dunne was ordained the first Bishop of Kitui in 1964.

Retiring at the age of 75 in 1995, he was succeeded by Boniface Lele as bishop. Dunne died in Nairobi Hospital on 31 March 2002.
