= Diocese of Kitui =

The Diocese of Kitui may refer to:

- Anglican Diocese of Kitui, in the city of Kitui, Kenya
- Roman Catholic Diocese of Kitui, in the city of Kitui, Kenya
