= Francis Baldacchino =

His Excellency Francis Baldacchino OFMCap
- Bishop of Malindi
- Church: Roman Catholic
- Diocese: Malindi
- Appointed: 2 June 2000
- In office: 2000-2009
- Successor: Emanuel Barbara

Orders
- Ordination: 18 March 1961
- Consecration: 2 September 2000 by Jozef Tomko
- Rank: Bishop

Personal details
- Born: July 6, 1936 Marsa, Malta
- Died: October 9, 2009 (aged 73) Msida Malta
- Buried: Capuchin Crypt Of Floriana

Francis Baldacchino (June 6, 1937 – October 9, 2009) was a Capuchin and the first Roman Catholic bishop of the Diocese of Malindi, Kenya.

== Biography ==
Born in Marsa, Malta, Baldacchino was ordained to the priesthood for the Friars Minor Capuchins on March 18, 1961. He went on a mission in Kenya in 1974. Between 1984 and 1990 he was Superior of the Capuchin mission in Kenya. Among his achievements, he organised and strengthened the formation of local Capuchins, especially by building a postulancy house in Mpeketoni and a major seminary in Nairobi. On June 2, 2000, Pope John Paul II appointed Baldacchino bishop and he was ordained on September 2, 2000. In 2010 he returned to Malta for medical treatment. He died a month later on October 9. His funeral took place in St John's Co-Cathedral on October 13 and was buried in the Addolorata cemetery in Paola, Malta. In 2011 his body was exhumed and reburied in Floriana.
