= Joseph Mwongela =

Kenyan Roman Catholic prelate (born 1968)

His Excellency, The Most Reverend Joseph Mwongela
- Coadjutor Bishop of Machakos, Kenya
- Church: Roman Catholic Church
- Archdiocese: Roman Catholic Archdiocese of Nairobi
- See: Roman Catholic Diocese of Machakos
- Appointed: 4 January 2026
- Successor: Incumbent
- Other posts: Bishop of Diocese of Kitui (17 March 2020 - 4 January 2026)

Orders
- Ordination: 7 September 1996
- Consecration: 29 August 2020 by Hubertus Matheus Maria van Megen
- Rank: Bishop

Personal details
- Born: Joseph Maluki Mwongela; 7 April 1968 (age 58) Kakumi, Kitui County, Kenya

Styles of Joseph Mwongela
- Reference style: His Excellency; The Most Reverend
- Spoken style: Your Excellency
- Religious style: Bishop

Joseph Maluki Mwongela (born 7 April 1968) is a Kenyan Roman Catholic prelate who serves as Coadjutor Bishop of the Roman Catholic Diocese of Machakos, in Kenya. He was appointed to that position on 4 January 2026 by Pope Leo XIV. Before that, from 17 March 2020 until 4 January 2026, he was the bishop of the Roman Catholic Diocese of Kitui. Pope Francis appointed him bishop on 17 March 2020. He was consecrated and installed at Kitui on 29 August 2020 by Hubertus Matheus Maria van Megen, Titular Archbishop of Novaliciana.

== Background and education ==
Joseph Mwongela was born on 7 April 1968, in Kakumi Village, in the Diocese of Kitui, in present-day Kitui County. He attended Saint Mary's Senior Seminary for the preparatory year. He studied philosophy at Saint Augustine's Senior Seminary in Mabanga. He then studied theology at Saint Thomas Aquinas Major Seminary in Nairobi. He graduated with a Licentiate in theology from the Pontifical Gregorian University in Rome, Italy. He also holds a Doctorate in theology awarded by the Pontifical University of Saint Thomas Aquinas (Angelicum).

== Priesthood ==
He was ordained a priest on 7 September 1996. He served as a priest of the Diocese of Kitui, until 17 March 2020. While a priest, he served in various roles and locations including:

- Parish vicar of Migwani Parish from 1996 until 1997.
- Parish priest of Ngumi Parish from 1997 until 1998.
- Formator at Saint Patrick Formation House from 1999 until 2001.
- Diocesan chancellor and director of the diocesan office for vocational pastoral care from 2001 until 2003.
- Studies in Rome leading to a licentiate in theology from the Pontifical Gregorian University and a doctorate in theology from the Pontifical University of Saint Thomas Aquinas (Angelicum) from 2003 until 2008.
- Parish priest of Muthade Parish from 2008 until 2013.
- Parish priest of Boma Parish from 2014 until 2015.
- Director of the Saint John Paul II Institute of Professional Studies from 2014 until 2015.
- Vicar General of the diocese of Kitui from 2015 until 2020.

== Bishop ==
Reverend Father Mwongela was appointed Bishop of Kitui on 17 March 2020 and was consecrated a bishop at Kitui on 29 August 2020 by Archbishop Hubertus Matheus Maria van Megen, Titular Archbishop of Novaliciana and Papal Nuncio to Kenya at that time, assisted by Cardinal John Njue, Archbishop of the Archdiocese of Nairobi and Archbishop Anthony Muheria, Archbishop of the Archdiocese of Nyeri.

Bishop Mwongela succeeded as bishop of the Kitui Diocese from Archbishop Anthony Muheria, of Nyeri Archdiocese, who was the apostolic administrator over Kitui diocese after he was transferred by the Pope to the Archdiocese of Nyeri in April 2017.

Mwongela was appointed coadjutor bishop of the Roman Catholic Diocese of Machakos on 4 January 2026 by Pope Leo XIV. Bishop Mwongela is expected to work with Bishop Norman King'oo Wambua, the local ordinary of the diocese and succeed at Machakos when that position falls vacant in the future. On 19 March 2026, Pope Leo XIV appointed him apostolic administrator of the Diocese of Kitui, until a substantive local ordinary is appointed in the future.

== Succession table ==
Catholic Church titles
Preceded by	Coadjutor Bishop of Machakos (since 4 January 2026)	Succeeded by Incumbent
Preceded by Anthony Muheria (28 June 2008 - 23 April 2017)	Bishop of Kitui (17 March 2020 - 4 January 2026)	Succeeded by Vacant
