= Pierluigi Sartorelli =

Italian prelate

Pierluigi Sartorelli (29 December 1912 – 28 April 1996) was an Italian prelate of the Catholic Church who worked in the diplomatic service of the Holy See.

== Biography ==
Pierluigi Sartorelli was born on 29 December 1912 in Venice, Italy. He was ordained a priest on 19 September 1942 for the Archdiocese of Rijeka.

To prepare for a diplomat's career he entered the Pontifical Ecclesiastical Academy in 1947.

He worked in the nunciature in Bern, Switzerland, from 1965 to 1967.

On 9 November 1967, Pope Paul VI appointed him titular archbishop of Semina and named him to Apostolic Pro-Nuncio to Kenya. Cardinal Giovanni Urbani ordained him a bishop on 8 of December. On 19 April 1968 Pope Paul named him also Apostolic Pro-Nuncio to Tanzania. Sartorelli resigned from that second position on 22 December 1970.

On 7 October 1972, Pope Paul appointed him Titular Archbishop of Castello.

Sartorelli resigned as nuncio to Kenya on 16 January 1976. He died on 28 April 1996.
