= Ailbhe Smyth =

Irish feminist and pro-choice campaigner

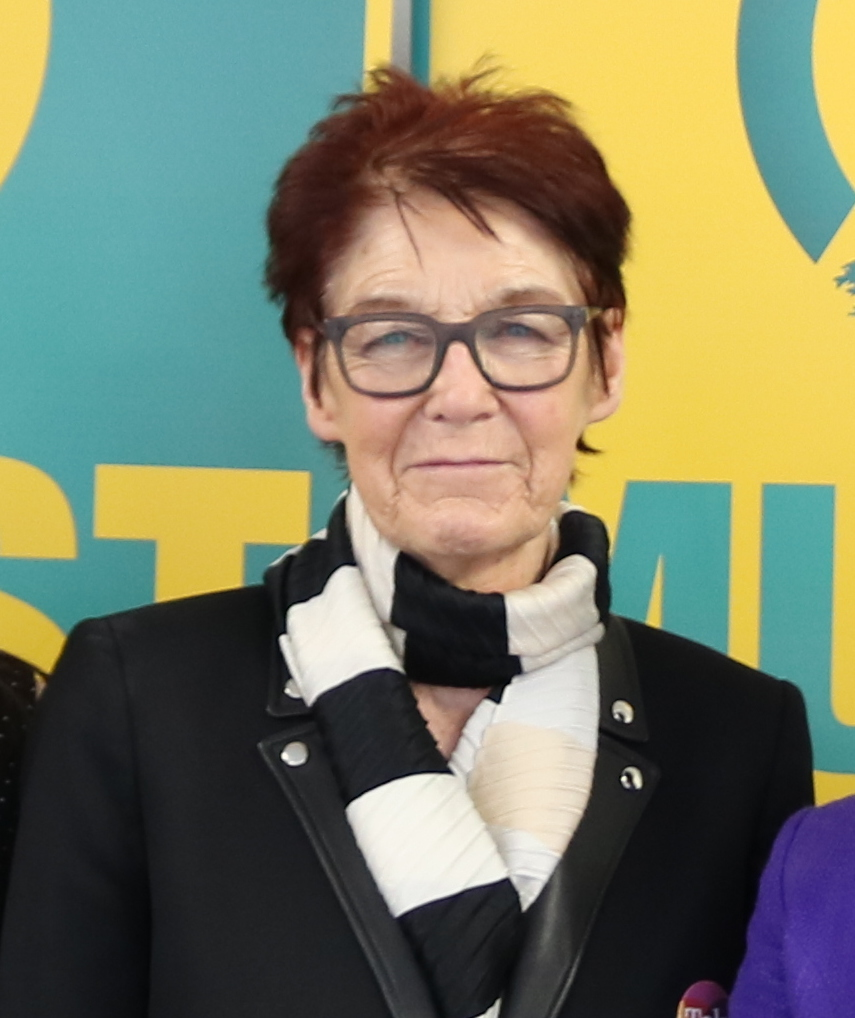
- Smyth in 2017

Personal details
- Education: University College Dublin
- Profession: Academic
- Known for: LGBT and feminist activism

Ailbhe Smyth (born 1946) is an Irish academic, feminist and LGBTQ activist. She was the founding director of the Women's Education, Resource and Research Centre (WERRC), University College Dublin (UCD).

== Education and academic career ==
Smyth began lecturing in the French department at the age of 21. During this time, she became increasingly more politically aware and began following the global women's movement, which led her to set up the Women's Study Forum at the beginning of the 1980s. This was a space where women came together to discuss issues which were affecting them including: work, sex, relationships, childcare, discrimination and violence. This was a discussion group with a strong cultural ethos and they invited women writers, poets, and artists to come and talk about interesting projects that they were involved with at the time. In 1990 Smyth established the Women's Education, Research and Resource Centre (WERRC) at UCD and was head of Women's Studies where she stayed until 2006.

During her time at UCD, her research highlighted the lack of women in senior academic posts in institutions across Ireland.

== Activism ==
Smyth began her involvement in activism in the later 1970s with the women's liberation movement. She was part of the movement opposed to the 8th Amendment to the Irish constitution, which placed a ban on abortion in Ireland, and a supporter of the campaign to legalise divorce in Ireland in 1986.

She was a co-director of the Together for Yes national referendum campaign on abortion, and spokeswoman and convener for the Coalition to Repeal the Eighth Amendment. She is also a founding member of Marriage Equality, convenor of Feminist Open Forum, an organiser for Action for Choice, and served as a board member of Equality and Rights Alliance.

She chaired the National LGBT Federation for over 10 years and in 2015 she received the 'Lifetime Achievement' award at the GALAS, Ireland's LGBTQ Awards Ceremony. In 2019, Smyth was named as one of the Time 100 most influential people alongside the other co-directors of Together for Yes, Grainne Griffin and Orla O'Connor, in recognition of their roles within the campaign to legalise abortion in Ireland.

Smyth was nominated by the Minister for Education to serve on the board of the Higher Education Authority twice and has served as a Trustee of the National Library of Ireland. Smyth is chair of Ballyfermot STAR Addiction Services and of Women's Aid, and a member of the board of Age Action. She works independently as a consultant and campaigner.

In March 2022 she was amongst 151 international feminists signing Feminist Resistance Against War: A Manifesto, in solidarity with the Russian Feminist Anti-War Resistance. (Note: This manifesto was criticized by both Ukrainian feminists and members of the Feminist Anti-War Resistance themselves.)

In 2022, Smyth was awarded the freedom of Dublin city. She was awarded an honorary doctorate from NUI Galway in April 2022.

== Personal life ==
Smyth was born in Dublin in 1946, the eldest of 6 children. Smyth married in the early 1970s, and later separated. She had her daughter in 1977, and cites her status as "illegitimate" as motivation to become involved in political activism. She divorced once it became legal in Ireland in the mid-1990s. Smyth came out as a lesbian in her late 30s.
