= Joseph Alessandro =

Maltese Bishop

His Excellency Joseph Alessandro O.F.M. Cap.
- Bishop of Garissa
- Church: Roman Catholic
- Diocese: Garissa
- Appointed: 8 December 2015
- In office: 2015-2022
- Predecessor: Paul Darmanin

Orders
- Ordination: 5 April 1970
- Consecration: 29 September 2012 by John Njue

Personal details
- Born: 30 November 1944 (age 81) Paola, Malta

Joseph Alessandro (born 30 November 1944) is a Maltese Bishop who was the Bishop of Garissa in Kenya. He retired on 17 February 2022.

== Early life ==
Alessandro was born on 30 November 1944 in Paola, Malta. At the age of 17 he was professed as a member of Order of Friars Minor Capuchin and in 1966 he professed his perpetual vows to the same order.

== Priesthood ==
He was ordained deacon in December 1969 and ordained priest the following year on 5 April 1970. In 1989 Alessandro went on a mission to Kenya where in 1994 he was shot and seriously injured whilst on his way to Garissa. Some years later he returned to Malta where he became the Provincial of the Capuchin Province of Malta. In Malta he also taught religion and lectured theology while serving on the diocesan film censorship board. In 2010 he returned to Kenya and was made Vicar General of the Diocese of Garissa by Bishop Paul Darmanin.

== Episcopate ==
In 2012 Pope Benedict XVI appointed Alessandro as the new Coadjutor Bishop of Garissa in Kenya. He was ordained bishop by Cardinal John Njue on 29 September 2012 in St John's Co-Cathedral Valletta and left Malta on 3 November.
