= Martin Kivuva Musonde =

Kenyan Roman Catholic priest

His Excellency Martin Kivuva Musonde
- Archbishop of Mombasa
- Church: Roman Catholic
- Archdiocese: Mombasa
- Installed: 21 February 2015
- Predecessor: Boniface Lele
- Previous post: Bishop of Machakos (2003-2015)

Orders
- Ordination: 9 December 1978
- Consecration: 3 June 2003 by Archbishop Raphael S. Ndingi Mwana a'Nzeki
- Rank: Archbishop

Personal details
- Born: 10 February 1952 (age 74) Muthetheni, Machakos, Kenya Colony
- Denomination: Roman Catholic
- Residence: Mombasa
- Profession: Mass Communication
- Education: St. Mary’s Seminary Kwale
- Alma mater: St. Thomas Aquinas Seminary, Nairobi; University of Nairobi
- Motto: "that all may be one"

Styles of Martin Kivuva Musonde
- Reference style: The Most Reverend
- Spoken style: Your Excellency
- Religious style: Archbishop

Martin Kivuva Musonde (born 10 February 1952) is the Roman Catholic Archbishop of the Archdiocese of Mombasa, effective 9 December 2014. He previously served as the Bishop of the Roman Catholic Diocese of Machakos from 2003 until 2014.

== Background and priesthood ==
He was born on 10 February 1952, in Muthetheni, in present-day Machakos County. He is the first born in a family of six brothers and three sisters. He was baptized on 22 March 1952. He attended Kyambusya Primary School in Muthetheni.

In 1961, his family moved to Kichaka Simba in present-day Kwale County. After the relocation, he joined Kichaka Simba Primary School. Later, he attended St. Mary's Junior Seminary in Kwale. He then studied philosophy and theology at St. Thomas Aquinas Seminary in Nairobi. Musonde was ordained priest on 9 December 1978 in the Archdiocese of Mombasa.

His first appointment as a priest was in Mwatate Parish in Taita-Taveta as an assistant Priest. From February 1979 until February 1989, he served as a parish priest in Our Lady of Fatima Parish Kongowea and at the same time as an officiating Chaplain to Kenya Armed Forces, at Nyali Barracks. From 1989 to 1992, he worked as a parish priest of Makupa Parish.

== Career in communication ==
From 1989 until 1992, he worked as a social communications coordinator for the Archdiocese of Mombasa. In 1992, he was appointed to work in Ukweli Video Productions in Nairobi where he later became the director, a position he held until his appointment as the Bishop of Machakos.

Archbishop Martin Kivuva holds certificates in building and construction from Mombasa Polytechnic, in Religious Studies from the University of Nairobi, in aid administration from Selly Oak College in Birmingham, England, in Radio Production from All Africa Conference of Churches in Nairobi, and a video and radio production from the Institute of Telecommunications in Dallas, Texas.

== As bishop ==
He was appointed bishop on 15 March 2003 and ordained and installed as the Bishop of Machakos on 3 June 2003 at Machakos Stadium. The Principal Consecrator at his consecration was Archbishop Raphael S. Ndingi Mwana a'Nzeki, the Archbishop of Nairobi, who was assisted by Archbishop John Njenga, Archbishop of Mombasa, and Archbishop Nicodemus Kirima, Archbishop of Nyeri.

On 9 December 2014, Bishop Martin Kivuva Musonde was appointed Archbishop of Mombasa and was installed as Archbishop on 21 February 2015. As bishop, he adopted the motto "that all may be one". He has been a champion of the rights of individuals and the disadvantaged, regardless of religious affiliation.
