= Archdiocese of Mombasa =

Roman Catholic archdiocese in Kenya

Archdiocese of Mombasa Archidioecesis Mombasaensis
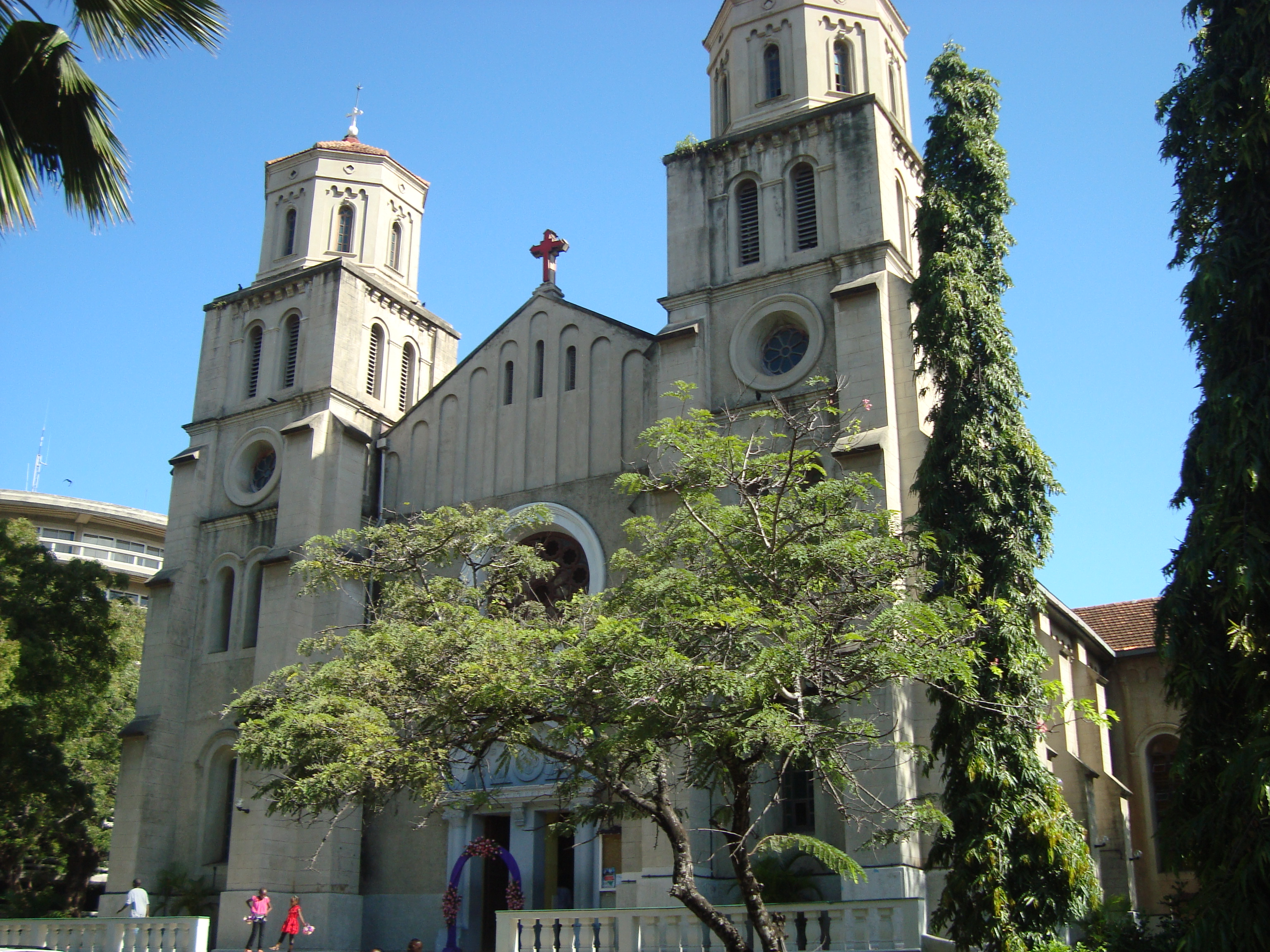
- Facade of the Mombasa Cathedral

Location
- Country: Kenya
- Ecclesiastical province: Mombasa

Statistics
- Area: 38,000 km^{2} (15,000 sq mi)
- Population: Total; Catholics: (as of 2015); 2,374,309; 346,382 (14.6%)
- Parishes: 52

Information
- Rite: Roman
- Established: 1955
- Cathedral: Holy Ghost Cathedral

Current leadership
- Pope: Leo XIV
- Metropolitan Archbishop: Martin Kivuva Musonde

Website
- mombasacatholic.org

The Roman Catholic Archdiocese of Mombasa (Latin: Mombasaën(sis)) is the Metropolitan See for the ecclesiastical province of Mombasa in Kenya.

== History ==
- May 8, 1955: Established as Diocese of Mombasa e Zanzibar from the Metropolitan Archdiocese of Nairobi
- December 12, 1964: Renamed as Diocese of Mombasa
- May 21, 1990: Promoted as Metropolitan Archdiocese of Mombasa

== Special churches ==
The seat of the archbishop is Holy Ghost Cathedral in Mombasa.

== Bishops ==
- Bishop of Mombasa e Zanzibar (Roman rite)
  - Bishop Eugene Joseph Butler, C.S.Sp. (1957–1964); see below
- Bishops of Mombasa (Roman rite)
  - Bishop Eugene Joseph Butler, C.S.Sp. (1964–1978); see above
  - Bishop Nicodemus Kirima (1978–1988), appointed Bishop of Nyeri; future Archbishop
  - Bishop John Njenga (1988–1990); see below
- Metropolitan Archbishops of Mombasa (Roman rite)
  - Archbishop John Joseph Njenga (1990–2005); see above
  - Archbishop Boniface Lele (2005–2014 Died)
  - Archbishop Martin Kivuva Musonde (2015–present)

== Suffragan dioceses ==
- Garissa
- Malindi

== Sources ==
- GCatholic.org
- Catholic Hierarchy
- Kenya Conference of Catholic Bishops
- Archdiocese of Mombasa
