= Controversies surrounding Opus Dei =

Opus Dei is a personal prelature within the Catholic Church that has been the subject of numerous controversies. Throughout its history, Opus Dei has been criticized by many, including by numerary members who knew the founder and had roles in Opus Dei's internal government. The reports by former members in the US, England, Spain, Ireland, Latin America, France, Germany, and other countries are published. Journalists have described it and its founder Josemaría Escrivá as "the most controversial force in the Catholic Church".

The canonization process of Escrivá has been described as unreliable. Controversies about Opus Dei have centered on allegations of secretiveness, but also on sexual abuse cases in Spain, Mexico, Uruguay, Chile, and the United States; cases that were investigated and resulted in canonical sanctions being applied to the perpetrators. Controversies have to do with recruiting methods aimed at teenagers becoming numeraries; the misleading of its lay faithful about their status and rights under Canon Law; the "mortification of the flesh" practiced by its celibate members (cilice, discipline, and sleeping on a board); elitism and misogyny; and support of authoritarian or right-wing governments, including the reactionary Franco regime.

According to former members of Opus Dei, the controversies about Opus Dei are rooted in practices institutionalized while Escrivá was alive and are written into internal documents and orally transmitted customs that have not been reviewed by Catholic Church officials. Some of the more famous former numeraries who have reported on these matters are: Maria del Carmen Tapia, secretary to Escrivá in Rome and commissioned by Escrivá to start the women's branch of Opus Dei in Venezuela; Vladimir Felzmann, a numerary priest; Miguel Fisac, who accompanied Escrivá across the Pyrenees during the Spanish Civil War and lived for years with him in Rome; Antonio Perez Tenessa, secretary general of Opus Dei and regional director of Opus Dei in Spain; and María Angustias Moreno.

Opus Dei has been criticized for allegedly seeking independence from and more influence within the Catholic Church. According to some journalists, criticisms against Opus Dei are based on jealousy or fabrications by opponents. Critics respond that some of these journalists are associated with Opus Dei, and that none of them interviewed numeraries who left Opus Dei in protest or examined internal governing documents. Defenders of Opus Dei point out that John Paul II and other Catholic leaders have endorsed Opus Dei's teaching on the sanctifying value of work, and its fidelity to Catholic beliefs.

== Historical opposition from Jesuits ==
Josemaría Escrivá had a Jesuit priest as a spiritual director (Fr. Sánchez) at the time that he founded Opus Dei. As a result, he apparently based some of the practices of Opus Dei on the Constitutions of the Society of Jesus, such as: required manifestation of conscience to a superior, seeking prestigious people for membership, a military-style hierarchical authority structure, and an emphasis on blind obedience as a means of efficiency in the apostolate.

Nevertheless, the superior general of the Society of Jesus, Fr. Wlodimir Ledóchowski (1866–1942), later told the Vatican he considered Opus Dei "very dangerous for the Church in Spain". He described it as having a "secretive character" and saw "signs in it of a covert inclination to dominate the world with a form of Christian Masonry". In the 1950s, some Jesuits told Italian parents of members of Opus Dei that their sons were being led to damnation.

Allegations like this from within well-regarded ecclesiastical circles ("the opposition by good people", as Escrivá called it) were interpreted by Escrivá as misunderstandings or jealousies, and defenders of Opus Dei today say that present-day criticisms are merely vestiges of this old prejudice. Specifically, they argue that criticism of Opus Dei by members of the Society of Jesus was caused by these Jesuits' not understanding the difference between Opus Dei and religious orders, and that this misunderstanding continues among people with a "clerical" or "religious" mentality. For Opus Dei officially describes itself in contrast to "religious" (monastic) life: ordinary lay Christians living out their baptismal call to holiness without being externally distinguished from other citizens.

Messori, a journalist associated with Opus Dei, also identifies political ideology as the root of some controversies involving some Jesuits. After Vatican II certain sectors of the Church became politically and theologically liberal, including Jesuits in Latin America who were experimenting with liberation theology. In contrast, some Opus Dei laymen had been working for the far-right Franco regime in Spain and similar regimes in Latin America. Escrivá himself gave a spiritual retreat to Franco, and the numerary priest and bishop Juan Luis Cipriani Thorne was reportedly friendly with Peru's president Fujimori and unsupportive of human rights advocates. Messori emphasizes, however, that Opus Dei has also had members from left-wing parties such as the UK Labour Party (see Opus Dei and politics).

== Corporal mortification ==
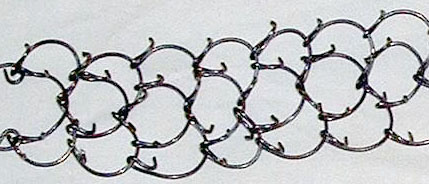
Closeup of a cilice—a small metal chain with inwardly pointing spikes

Much public attention has focused on Opus Dei's encouragement of the practice of bodily mortification, especially due to news reports and after descriptions of the practice appeared in the popular novel The Da Vinci Code.

Opus Dei's celibate members (numeraries, numerary assistants, and associates) practice three forms of corporal mortification that were traditionally used in religious orders and by some laypeople in Catholic countries such as Spain. One of the more controversial forms of mortification is the use of a cilice, a small metal chain with inwardly pointing spikes that is worn around the upper thigh. The cilice's spikes cause pain and may leave small marks, but typically do not cause bleeding. Numeraries, associates, and numerary assistants are expected to wear a cilice for two hours each day except feast days. Another mortification is to whip themselves with a small "discipline" (a corded rope whip) for a few minutes once a week while saying a prayer, as a participation in Jesus' scourging. (Escrivá had special whips for himself with metal tips on the end; these caused bleeding.) Additionally, female numeraries only are required to sleep on a board instead of a mattress (or boards on top of mattress). Former female members have explained that Escrivá justified this rule by saying that since women numeraries give up having children (by celibacy, inter alia), they need this special mortification to keep them emotionally strong. Male numeraries are expected, instead, to sleep on the floor one night a week. Supernumeraries and associates, who do not live in Opus Dei centers (and hence might share a bed or a bedroom with family members), are instead expected or encouraged to sleep one night per week without a pillow.

Mortification ("dying to oneself") has had a long history within the Catholic Church (e.g. mediaeval religious often fasted on certain days while reciting particular prayers, etc.). Corporal mortification, of the type practiced by Opus Dei numeraries, however, is a rare practice for modern Catholics, and the Church itself does not tend to teach, encourage, or even condone such displays. Opus Dei points out that mortification of various types has been practiced by certain revered individual Catholics, including Mother Teresa, Óscar Romero and Padre Pio. Escrivá accused the secularised world of inconsistency in so far as it accepts physical pain and sacrifice in other domains—such as athletics, business, and for personal beautification—but objects to such acts when done for a religious purpose.

== Allegations of aggressive recruiting ==
Opponents allege Opus Dei uses cult-like practices in recruitment. For instance, Jesuit priest and writer James Martin wrote that Opus Dei puts great emphasis on recruiting, and pointed to Escriva's writings which say "You must kill yourselves for proselytism." David Clark, a consultant who specialises in helping people leave cults, stated in 2006 that Opus Dei used a cult-like recruitment technique called "love bombing", in which potential members are showered with flattery and admiration by members of the organization in order to entice them into joining. The mother of a member studying at Harvard University stated that the group recruited and then separated her daughter from her family over several years; in 1991, the same mother founded the Opus Dei Awareness Network (ODAN), a group that aims to provide information and support to those harmed by Opus Dei while exposing the group's negative effects and practices.

== Allegations of coercion ==
Critics accuse the organization of maintaining an extremely high degree of control over its members. Ex-members state that Opus Dei directors read letters of the members. According to a 2006 report by the BBC World Service, Jose Carlos Martin de la Hoz, priest of the prelature in Spain, said this practice existed in the past, but clarified it was a manifestation of opening and confidence of the faithfuls of the Opus Dei. In 2001, an Opus Dei spokesman said the practice of reading the mail of numeraries was abandoned years ago, since written letters are now rarely used for correspondence. As an additional means of guidance, it was deemed fitting for numeraries to first show to or tell the Directors about the contents of the letter, especially when the letter would need to touch on vocation.

About 20% of Opus Dei are celibate. They live in special residential centers where they lead extremely structured lives; critics say this practice isolates its members from the rest of society and allows Opus Dei to have nearly total control over its members' environments. For some books, a numerary's direct supervisor can provide permission, but for other books, permission can only be given by the prelate in Rome. According to some critics, Opus Dei pressures numeraries to cut off social contact with non-members, including their own families. Numeraries in Opus Dei generally hand over their entire salaries to the organization, and critics say this makes numeraries extremely dependent upon the organization.

A defence of Opus Dei's list of inappropriate books is found in recognition that the Vatican itself maintained a similar list until the 1960s. To explain the celibate lifestyle of numeraries and their relationships with their families, supporters quote Jesus's comment (Matthew 10:37) that "He who loves his father or mother more than me is not worthy of me."

== Allegations of secrecy ==
Critics have often accused Opus Dei of intense secrecy. Due to its secrecy critics such as the Jesuit Wladimir Ledóchowski sometimes refer to Opus Dei as a "Catholic", "Christian", or "white" form of Freemasonry. Opus Dei does not publish membership lists, and members generally do not publicly reveal they are part of the organization. According to its 1950 constitution, members are forbidden to reveal their membership without the express permission of their superiors. This practice has led to rampant speculation about who may or may not be a member of Opus Dei. The 1950 constitution similarly prohibited even revealing how many people were members of Opus Dei.

Additionally, critics say Opus Dei is secretive about its activities. Opponents cite the fact Opus Dei often will not directly reveal its relationship to many of its institutions. According to critics, Opus Dei does not allow many of its own rules to be made public. For example, the 1950 Constitution states, "These Constitutions, published instructions, and those which in the future may be published, and the other things pertaining to the government of the Institute are never to be made public. Indeed, without the permission of the Father [Escrivá] those documents which are written in the Latin language may not be translated into [other] languages." Similarly, Opus Dei does not reveal details about its finances.

Allen says, "Opus Dei cannot be called secretive." Accusations of secrecy, he says, stem from mistakenly equating its members with monks and expecting members to behave as clerics. Instead, its lay members, like normal professionals, are ultimately responsible for their personal actions, and do not externally represent the prelature which provides them spiritual training. Opus Dei itself, he says, provides abundant information. Supporters say Opus Dei's relative silence stems not from a secretive nature, but rather is the result of a deep commitment to privacy, humility, and "avoidance of self-aggrandizement". Supporters argue Opus Dei "has the obligation to respect its members' privacy" They say members of Opus Dei do generally reveal their membership status to their family and closest friends. The historical opposition to Opus Dei may also have contributed to the need for privacy— as one author speculates, "I think part of it, too, is that, historically, because a lot of people didn't like Opus Dei, there was just a sense that it would be better not to be too upfront because you're just inviting hostility."

Robert Hanssen, arrested for spying for Russians, was an active Opus Dei member.

== Legal disputes ==
In 2016, a French court of appeal found the Opus Dei-controlled "Dosnon" hospitality training school ("ACUT"), along with two of its managers (both Opus Dei members), guilty of under-paying and not declaring the employment of 99 students and workers at the school, including minors. The same court ordered ACUT to pay compensation to ex-Opus Dei member Cathérine Tissier, for physical and psychological injury related to her overwork and exploitation by ACUT.

Opus Dei has twice been engaged in legal disputes in connection with their Danish trademark (CTM Registration No. 844.860 OPUS DEI (word)), as they claimed infringement firstly in 2002 regarding the magazine "Opus Gay" and lost, and secondly regarding the philosophy-themed atheist card game "Opus-Dei: Existence After Religion", which contained no reference to the organization, in which it unsuccessfully disputed the registration of an internet domain name.

== Women ==
The role of women in Opus Dei is a source of criticism, and in recent years there have been lawsuits and allegations of abuse and exploitation by former members. Women are treated as equal in Opus Dei but are separated from men in their personal spiritual training. In many male Opus Dei centres, women visit every evening to cook for the men and then leave without social interaction, as Escrivá recognised that despite the equality of men and women, centres for men may need a female influence to function.

== Alleged independence and influence within the Roman Catholic Church ==
According to critics, elevating Opus Dei to the status of a personal prelature allows its members to "go about their business almost untouched by criticism or oversight by bishops". According to critics, Opus Dei has such autonomy it has become essentially a "church within a church".

Catholic officials say church authorities have even greater control of Opus Dei now its head is a prelate appointed by the Pope, and they argue members are "even more conscious of belonging to the Church". They point to canon law that states that Opus Dei members remain under "jurisdiction of the diocesan bishop in what the law lays down for all the ordinary [Catholics]". Similarly, they point out that Opus Dei must obtain permission from the local bishop before establishing an Opus Dei center within the diocese.

Some critics say Opus Dei exerts a disproportionately large influence within the Church itself. They point to the unusually hasty (and otherwise irregular) process in which Escriva was canonized. Pope John Paul II was a supporter of Opus Dei, and during his pontificate the head of the Vatican press office was a member of Opus Dei. An Opus Dei spokesman says "the influence of Opus Dei in the [Vatican] has been exaggerated." Of the nearly 200 cardinals in the Roman Catholic Church, only two are known to be members of Opus Dei. Similarly, of the nearly 4000 bishops, only 20 are known to be members of Opus Dei.

Von Peter Hertel of Der Spiegel refers to Opus Dei as "Santa Mafia" or in Vicente R. Pilapil's words, "Holy Mafia" due to what they say are questionable business activities.

John L. Allen Jr. said that Escriva's relatively quick canonization does not have anything to do with power but with improvements in procedures and John Paul II's decision to make Escriva's sanctity and message known (see Opus Dei and politics).

== Objections to critics ==
Supporters of Opus Dei say criticisms of it are often motivated by bad faith, jealousy, vengefulness, or other biases on the part of the critics. In some cases, supporters accuse critics of merely misunderstanding Opus Dei, its mission, or its novelty.

While the doors of Opus Dei are open to everyone, no matter from which race or country, without any difference among men and women, individuals can participate either as members (if they are baptized and have a true vocation) or as supporter.

=== Secularism ===
Opus Dei's supporters often see criticism as motivated by "a religious bias or political agenda". Many supporters say criticisms of Opus Dei stem from a generalized disapproval of spirituality, Christianity, or Catholicism.

=== Jesuits and liberal Catholics ===
According to Time magazine, "church liberals, once riding high, have understood for decades that Rome does not incline their way. They feel abandoned, says John L. Allen Jr., 'and whenever you feel that way, there's a natural desire to find someone to blame.'"

The animosity from within the Church derives from the conflicting views of the role of the Church following Vatican II. At the time, the superior of the Jesuits, Pedro Arrupe, "symbolised the new post-Vatican II ethos, calling his Jesuits to be 'men for others', which in practice sometimes meant joining movements for peace and justice", while "Escrivá walked another path, insisting on the primacy of traditional forms of prayer, devotion, and the sacramental life." Making Opus Dei a "personal prelature" and Escrivá a saint "seemed like a clampdown on the Jesuits—almost as if a torch was being passed." As Allen points out, some of Opus Dei's harshest critics were once Jesuit priests.

== Controversy as a sign of contradiction ==
Some supporters of Opus Dei have viewed the controversy surrounding the organization as a "sign of contradiction". Proponents of this view hold that blessed, divinely inspired Christian organizations will always be criticized, just as Jesus was criticized by his contemporaries. John Carmel Heenan, cardinal and Archbishop of Westminster, commented in 1975 that "One of the proofs of God's favour is to be a sign of contradiction. Almost all founders of societies in the Church have suffered. Monsignor Escrivá de Balaguer is no exception. Opus Dei has been attacked and its motives misunderstood. In this country and elsewhere an inquiry has always vindicated Opus Dei." Some Opus Dei see the very existence of critics as further proof of the organization's sanctity.

John Paul II stated in his decree on the heroic virtues of Opus Dei's founder Josemaría Escrivá: "God allowed him to suffer public attacks. He responded invariably with pardon, to the point of considering his detractors as benefactors. But this Cross was such a source of blessings from heaven that the Servant of God's apostolate [or evangelizing work] spread with astonishing speed."

== See also ==
- Criticism of Pope John Paul II § Opus Dei and Legion of Christ controversies
- Francoist influence in Chile

== Books and notes ==
- "Opus Dei," Time Magazine, March 18, 1957.
- William O'Connor. Opus Dei: An Open Book. A Reply to "The Secret World of Opus Dei" by Michael Walsh. Mercier Press, Dublin 1991, ISBN 0-85342-987-1
- Vittorio Messori (1997). Leadership and Vision in the Catholic Church. Regnery. -- This book has a chapter entitled the Dark Tale and another one titled One Prelature, Many Cults
- Beyond the Threshold A Life in Opus Dei by Maria del Carmen Tapia, former numerary, Chapter One
- Religious Movements Homepage: Opus Dei by Corey Hanson, University of Virginia
- Aranda, Antonio, El bullir de la sangre de Cristo, a study of Blessed Josemaria's theological teachings. 2000, professor at the Opus Dei-run Pontifical Atheneum of the Holy Cross
- Belda et al. Holiness and the World, Symposion on Opus Dei by the Opus Dei-run Pontifical Atheneum of the Holy Cross
- Benedict XVI., Letting God Work, an article by then-Cardinal Joseph Ratzinger, published 2002 in the Osservatore Romano
- Basil Hume Guidelines for Opus Dei within the Diocese of Westminster December 2, 1981
- Hans Küng, The Catholic Church : A Short History, 2002 ISBN 0-8129-6762-3 (Quote translated from German original)
- Kim Lawton, Opus Dei Cover Story of Religion and Ethics, June 29, 2001
- Martin, James, Opus Dei In the United States, 1995, America
- Schmitt, William Opus Dei response to James Martin's article in America
