= Andrés Vázquez =

Andrés Vázquez may refer to:

- Andrés Vázquez (baseball)
- Andrés Vázquez (bullfighter)
- Andrés Vázquez de Prada, Spanish historian, lawyer and diplomat
