= Josemaría Escrivá =

Spanish Catholic priest and saint (1902–1975)

Saint Josemaría Escrivá
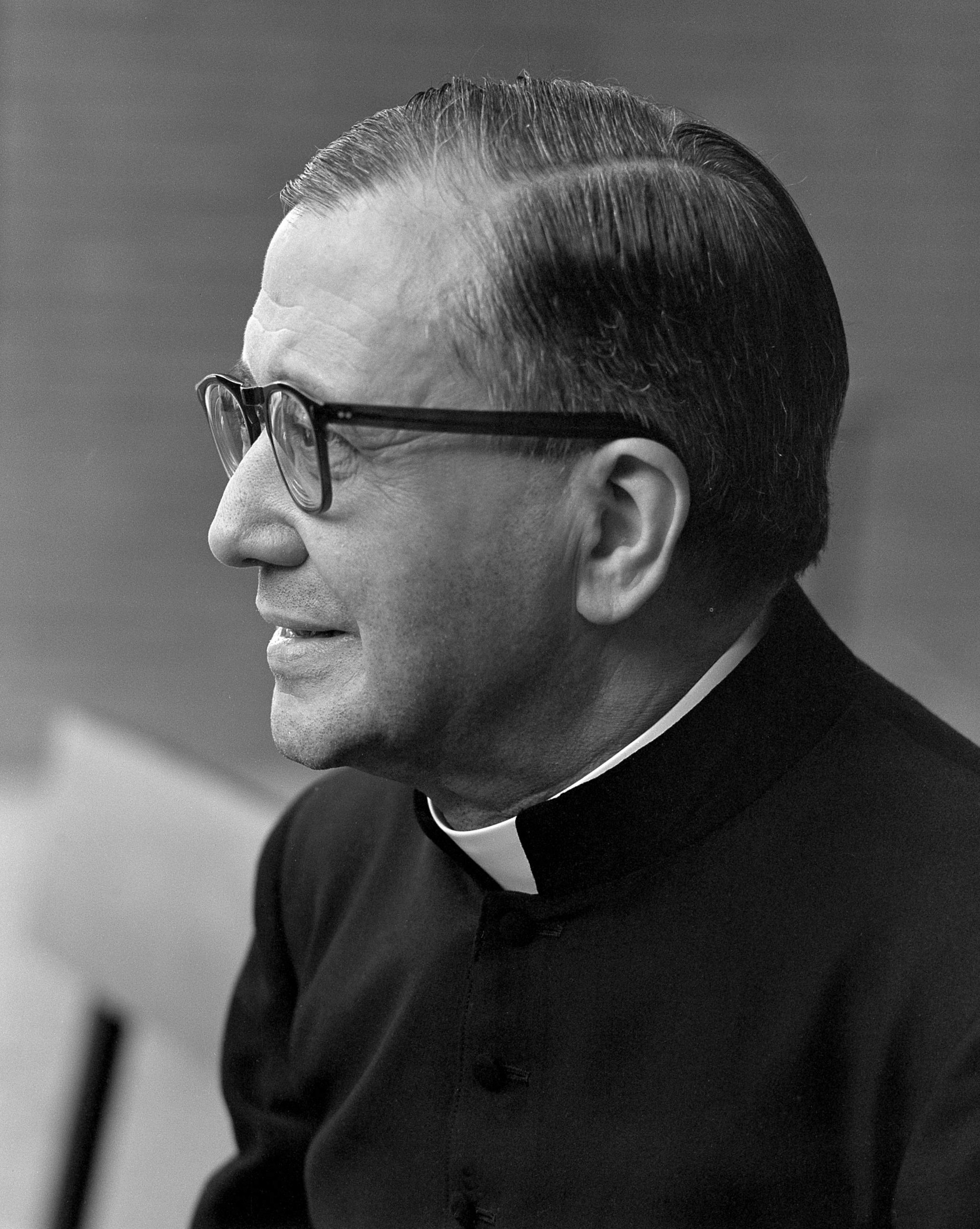
- Escrivá in 1966

Priest and Saint of Ordinary Life
- Born: Jose María Mariano Escribá Albás; 9 January 1902; Barbastro, Spain
- Died: 26 June 1975 (aged 73); Rome, Italy
- Venerated in: Catholic Church, Palmarian Church
- Beatified: 17 May 1992, Saint Peter's Square, Vatican City by Pope John Paul II
- Canonized: 6 October 2002, Saint Peter's Square, Vatican City by Pope John Paul II
- Major shrine: Our Lady of Peace, Prelatic Church of Opus Dei, Rome, Italy
- Feast: 26 June
- Attributes: Priest attire Rosary
- Patronage: Opus Dei; People with diabetes
- Coat of arms of Saint Josemaria Escrivá

Josemaría Escrivá de Balaguer y Albás (Note: Spanish: [xosemaˈɾia eskriˈβa ðe βalaˈɣeɾ j alˈβas]) (9 January 1902 – 26 June 1975) was a Spanish Catholic priest who founded Opus Dei, an organization of laypeople and priests dedicated to the principle of everyday holiness. He was canonized by Pope John Paul II in 2002.

Escrivá studied for the priesthood in Logroño and Zaragoza and in 1925 was ordained in the latter. He then moved to Madrid, where he pursued doctoral studies in civil law at the Central University. After the start of the Spanish Civil War in 1936, Escrivá fled from Madrid, via Andorra and France, to the city of Burgos, which at the time served as the headquarters of the rebel Nationalist forces under General Francisco Franco. After the military triumph of the Nationalists, Escrivá returned to Madrid and completed his doctorate in 1939. His principal work was the initiation, government and expansion of Opus Dei. His best-known publication is The Way, which has been translated into 43 languages and has sold several million copies. Escrivá settled in Rome in 1946. In 1955, he received a doctorate in theology from the Lateran University.

Escrivá and Opus Dei have attracted attention and controversy within the Catholic Church and in the worldwide press, including allegations of secrecy, elitism, cult-like practices, collaboration with the dictatorship of General Franco in Spain (1936–1975) and other right-wing political causes, as well as financial malfeasance. After his death, Escrivá's beatification and canonization in 2002 also generated considerable comment and contention. Several former members of Opus Dei and associates of Escrivá have publicly questioned his personal character and holiness.

Sources close to Opus Dei, and some independent journalists such as the Vatican analyst John L. Allen Jr., have argued that many of those accusations are unproven and originate with Escrivá's personal enemies. John Paul II and other Catholic leaders have endorsed Escrivá's teachings on the universal call to holiness, the role of the laity, and the sanctifying effect of ordinary work. According to Allen, among Catholics, Escrivá is "reviled by some and venerated by millions more".

== Biography ==
=== Early life ===
José María Mariano Escrivá y Albás was born to José Escrivá y Corzán and his wife, María de los Dolores Albás y Blanc on 9 January 1902, in the small town of Barbastro, in Huesca, Spain, the second of six children and the first of two sons. José Escrivá was a merchant and a partner in a textile company that eventually went bankrupt, forcing the family to relocate in 1915 to the city of Logroño, in the northern province of La Rioja, where he worked as a clerk in a clothing store. Young Josemaría first felt that "he had been chosen for something", it is reported, when he saw footprints left in the snow by a monk walking barefoot.

With his father's blessing, Escrivá prepared to become a priest of the Catholic Church. He studied first in Logroño and then in Zaragoza, where he was ordained as deacon on Saturday, 20 December 1924. He was ordained a priest, also in Zaragoza, on Saturday, 28 March 1925. Beginning in 1922, he also studied law at the University of Zaragoza, receiving the corresponding licenciate degree in 1927.

After a brief appointment to a rural parish in Perdiguera, Escrivá went to Madrid in 1927 to pursue a doctorate in civil law at the Central University. In Madrid, Escrivá found employment as a private tutor and as a chaplain to the Foundation of Santa Isabel, which comprised the royal Convent of Santa Isabel and a school managed by the Little Sisters of the Assumption.

=== Mission as the founder of Opus Dei ===
A prayerful retreat helped him to discern more definitely what he considered to be God's will for him, and, on 2 October 1928, he "saw" Opus Dei (English: Work of God), a way by which Catholics might learn to sanctify themselves by their secular work. He founded it in 1928, and Pius XII gave it final approval in 1950. According to the decree of the Congregation for the Causes of Saints, which contains a condensed biography of Escrivá, "[t]o this mission he gave himself totally. From the beginning his was a very wide-ranging apostolate in social environments of all kinds. He worked especially among the poor and the sick languishing in the slums and hospitals of Madrid."

During the Spanish Civil War, Escrivá fled from Madrid, which was controlled by the anti-clerical Republicans, via Andorra and France, to the city of Burgos, which was the headquarters of General Francisco Franco's Nationalist forces. After the war ended in 1939 with Franco's victory, Escrivá was able to resume his studies in Madrid and complete a doctorate in law, for which he submitted a thesis on the historical jurisdiction of the abbess of Santa María la Real de Las Huelgas.

The Priestly Society of the Holy Cross, affiliated with Opus Dei, was founded on Sunday, 14 February 1943. Escrivá relocated to Rome in 1946. The decree declaring Escrivá "Venerable" states that "in 1947 and on Monday, 16 June 1950, he obtained approval of Opus Dei as an institution of pontifical right. With tireless charity and operative hope he guided the development of Opus Dei throughout the world, activating a vast mobilization of lay people ... He gave life to numerous initiatives in the work of evangelization and human welfare; he fostered vocations to the priesthood and the religious life everywhere... Above all, he devoted himself tirelessly to the task of forming the members of Opus Dei."

=== Later years ===
According to some accounts, at the age of two he suffered from a disease, perhaps epilepsy so severe that the doctors expected him to die soon, but his mother had taken him to Torreciudad, where the Aragonese locals venerated a statue of the Virgin Mary (as "Our Lady of the Angels"), thought to date from the 11th century. Escrivá recovered and, as the director of Opus Dei during the 1960s and 1970s, promoted and oversaw the design and construction of a major shrine at Torreciudad. The new shrine was inaugurated on 7 July 1975, soon after Escrivá's death, and to this day remains the spiritual center of Opus Dei, as well as an important destination for pilgrimage. By the time of Escrivá's death in 1975, the members of Opus Dei numbered some 60,000 in 80 countries. As an adult, Escrivá suffered from type 1 diabetes and, according to some sources, also epilepsy.

In 1950, Escrivá was appointed an Honorary Domestic Prelate by Pope Pius XII, which allowed him to use the title of Monsignor. In 1955, he received a doctorate of theology from the Pontifical Lateran University in Rome. He was a consultor to two Vatican congregations (the Congregation for Seminaries and Universities and the Pontifical Commission for the Authentic Interpretation of the Code of Canon Law) and an honorary member of the Pontifical Academy of Theology. The Second Vatican Council (1962–1965) confirmed the importance of the universal call to holiness, the role of the laity, and the Mass as the basis of Christian life.

In 1948, Escrivá founded the Collegium Romanum Sanctae Crucis (Roman College of the Holy Cross), Opus Dei's educational center for men, in Rome. In 1953 he founded the Collegium Romanum Sanctae Mariae (Roman College of Saint Mary) to serve the women's section (these institutions are now joined into the Pontifical University of the Holy Cross.) Escrivá also established the University of Navarre, in Pamplona, and the University of Piura (in Peru), as secular institutions affiliated with Opus Dei. Escrivá died of cardiac arrest on 26 June 1975, aged 73. Three years after Escrivá died, the then Cardinal Albino Luciani (later Pope John Paul I) celebrated the originality of his contribution to Christian spirituality.

== Personality and attitudes ==
=== Attitudes in general ===
One of the persons who knew Escrivá best was the Bishop of Madrid, where Opus Dei was initiated, Bishop Leopoldo Eijo y Garay, for Escrivá would visit and report to him quite frequently and the two established a very strong friendship. In a 1943 report to Rome, the bishop stated: "The distinctive notes of his character are his energy and his capacity for organization and government; with an ability to pass unnoticed. He has shown himself most obedient to the Church hierarchy -- one very special hallmark of his priestly work is the way he fosters, in speech and in writing, in public and in private, love for Holy Mother Church and for the Roman Pontiff." Bishop Eijo y Garay wrote to the Jesuit Provincial of Toledo, Carlos Gomez Martinho, S.J. in 1941: "Fr. Escrivá is an exemplary priest, chosen by God for apostolic enterprises; humble, prudent, self-sacrificing in work, docile to his bishop, of outstanding intelligence and with a very solid spiritual and doctrinal formation." Eijo y Garay told an officer of the Falange that "[T]o think that Fr. Josemaría Escrivá is capable of creating anything secret is absurd. He is as frank and open as a child!"

Viktor Frankl, an Austrian psychiatrist and neurologist, founder of "logotherapy", and a Nazi concentration camp survivor, met Escrivá in Rome in 1970 and later wrote of "the refreshing serenity which emanated from him and warmed the whole conversation", and "the unbelievable rhythm" with which his thought flowed, and finally "his amazing capacity" for getting into "immediate contact" with those with whom he was speaking. Frankl went on: "Escrivá evidently lived totally in the present moment, he opened out to it completely, and gave himself entirely to it." According to Álvaro del Portillo, who was Escrivá's closest collaborator for many years, there was one basic quality of Escrivá "that pervaded everything else: his dedication to God, and to all souls for God's sake; his constant readiness to correspond generously to the will of God."

Pope Paul VI summarized his opinion of what he termed the "extraordinariness" of Escrivá's sanctity in this way: "He is one of those men who has received the most charisms (supernatural gifts) and have corresponded most generously to them." John L. Allen Jr., writing after watching some movies on the founder of Opus Dei in 2005, "The first impression one gets from watching Escrivá 'live'", "is his effervescence, his keen sense of humor. He cracks jokes, makes faces, roams the stage, and generally leaves his audience in stitches in off-the-cuff responses to questions from people in the crowd." Critics, such as Spanish architect Miguel Fisac, who was one of the earliest members of Opus Dei and who associated with Escrivá for nearly twenty years before ending his relation with Escrivá and Opus Dei, have given a very different description of Escrivá as a pious but vain, secretive, and ambitious man, given to private displays of violent temper, and who demonstrated little charity towards others or genuine concern for the poor. According to British journalist Giles Tremlett, "biographies of Escrivá have produced conflicting visions of the saint as either a loving, caring charismatic person or a mean-spirited, manipulative egoist". French historian Édouard de Blaye has referred to Escrivá as a "mixture of mysticism and ambition".

=== Towards God ===
==== Prayer ====
On the centennial of Escrivá's birthday, Cardinal Ratzinger (who became Pope Benedict XVI) commented: "I have always been impressed by Josemaría Escrivá's explanation of the name 'Opus Dei': an explanation ... gives us an idea of the founder's spiritual profile. Escrivá knew he had to found something, but he was also conscious that what he was founding was not his own work, that he himself did not invent anything and that the Lord was merely making use of him. So it was not his work, but Opus Dei (God's Work). [This] gives us to understand that he was in a permanent dialogue, a real contact with the One who created us and works for us and with us... If therefore St Josemaría speaks of the common vocation to holiness, it seems to me that he is basically drawing on his own personal experience, not of having done incredible things himself, but of having let God work. Therefore a renewal, a force for good was born in the world even if human weaknesses will always remain."

In his canonization homily, Pope John Paul II described Escrivá as "a master in the practice of prayer, which he considered to be an extraordinary 'weapon' to redeem the world...It is not a paradox but a perennial truth; the fruitfulness of the apostolate lies above all in prayer and in intense and constant sacramental life." In John Paul II's Decree of Canonization, he refers to the five brief prayers or aspirations of Escrivá through which "one can trace the entire life story of Blessed Josemaría Escrivá. He was barely sixteen when he began to recite the first two aspirations [Domine, ut videam!, Lord, that I might see! and Domina, ut sit!, Lady, that it might be!], as soon as he had the first inklings of God's call. They expressed the burning desire of his heart: to see what God was asking of him, so that he might do it without delay, lovingly fulfilling the Lord's will. The third aspiration [Omnes cum Petro ad Iesum per Mariam!, All together with Peter to Jesus through Mary!] appears frequently in his writings as a young priest and shows how his zeal to win souls for God went hand in hand with both a firm determination to be faithful to the Church and an ardent devotion to Mary, the Virgin Mother of God. Regnare Christum volumus! We want Christ to reign!: these words aptly express his constant pastoral concern to spread among all men and women the call to share, through Christ, in the dignity of God's children. God's sons and daughters should live for the purpose, to serve Him alone: Deo omnis gloria! All the glory to God!"

During the thanksgiving Mass for the canonization of St. Josemaría, John Paul II, said: "In the Founder of Opus Dei, there is an extraordinary love for the will of God. There exists a sure criterion of holiness: fidelity in accomplishing the divine will down to the last consequences. For each one of us the Lord has a plan, to each he entrusts a mission on earth. The saint could not even conceive of himself outside of God's plan. He lived only to achieve it. St Josemaría was chosen by the Lord to announce the universal call to holiness and to point out that daily life and ordinary activities are a path to holiness. One could say that he was the saint of ordinary life." Not all Catholic commentators were impressed equally by Escrivá's spirituality. For instance, the Swiss theologian Hans Urs von Balthasar wrote in an article of 1963 that Escrivá's The Way provided an "insufficient spirituality" to sustain a religious organization and that the book was hardly more than "a little Spanish manual for advanced Boy Scouts". Von Balthasar also questioned the attitudes towards prayer described by The Way, declaring that Escrivá's use of prayer

moves almost exclusively within the circle of the self, of a self that must be great and strong, equipped with pagan virtues, apostolic and Napoleonic. That which is most necessary, which is the contemplative rooting of the Word "on good soil" (Matthew 13:8), that which constitutes the aim of the prayers of the saints, of the great founders, the prayer of a Foucauld, is something one will search for in vain here.

Von Balthasar repeated his negative evaluation of The Way in a television interview from 1984. Similar criticism of Escrivá's spirituality has been stated by other commentators: for instance, according to Kenneth L. Woodward, a journalist who specializes in articles about the Catholic Church, "to judge by his writings alone, Escrivá's was an unexceptional spirit, derivative and often banal in his thoughts, personally inspiring, perhaps, but devoid of original insights", whose book The Way reveals "a remarkable narrowness of mind, weariness of human sexuality, and artlessness of expression." The Spanish journalist Luis Carandell, who published a critical biography of Escrivá in 1975, described The Way as "in many aspects nothing more than a mediocre imitation of the Exercises of St. Ignatius."

==== Towards the liturgy ====
Escrivá saw the Mass as the "Source and summit of the Christian's interior life," a conception used by Pius XII in Mediator Dei, and later enshrined by the Second Vatican Council in Lumen Gentium. Escrivá strove to obey whatever was indicated by the competent authority regarding the celebration of Mass and "[h]e took all necessary steps to ensure that the prescriptions of Vatican II, notably in the area of the liturgy, were applied within Opus Dei." As his prayer was much integrated with traditional liturgy, Escrivá found the transition difficult and asked Echevarría to help him with respect to the new rites. Although he missed the practices of the old rites, especially some gestures such as the kissing of the paten (a small plate, usually made of silver or gold, used to hold the Eucharist), he prohibited his devotees to ask for any dispensation for him "out of a spirit of obedience to ecclesiastical norms... He has decided to show his love for the liturgy through the new rite", commented Echevarría. However, when Annibale Bugnini, Secretary of the Consilium for the Implementation of the Constitution on the Liturgy, learned of Escrivá's difficulties, he granted Escrivá the possibility of celebrating the Mass using the old rite. Whenever Escrivá celebrated this rite, he did so only in the presence of one Mass server.

Vladimir Felzmann, a priest who worked as Escrivá's personal assistant before quitting Opus Dei in 1981, stated in an interview for Newsweek that Escrivá was so distraught by the reforms introduced by the Second Vatican Council that he and his deputy, Álvaro del Portillo, "went to Greece in 1967 to see if [they] could bring Opus Dei into the Greek Orthodox Church. Escrivá thought the [Catholic] church was a shambles and that the Orthodox might be the salvation of himself and of Opus Dei as the faithful remnant." Felzmann says that Escrivá soon abandoned those plans as impracticable. Flavio Capucci, a member of Opus Dei and the postulator of the cause for Escrivá's canonization, denies that Escrivá ever contemplated quitting the Catholic Church. This was also denied by the information office of Opus Dei, which stated that Escrivá's visit to Greece in 1966 was done in order to analyze the convenience of organizing Opus Dei in that country, and that Escrivá even brought back icons as presents for Pope Paul VI and Angelo Dell'Acqua (then the substitute to the Vatican Secretary of State), whom he had informed of the visit beforehand.

==== Mortification ====
Escrivá taught that "joy has its roots in the form of a cross", and that "suffering is the touchstone of love", convictions which were represented in his own life. He practiced corporal mortification personally and recommended it to others in Opus Dei. In particular, his enthusiasm for the practice of self-flagellation has attracted controversy, with critics quoting testimonies about Escrivá whipping himself furiously until the walls of his cubicle were speckled with blood. Both the practice of self-mortification as a form of penance, and the conviction that suffering can help a person to acquire sanctity, have ample precedent in Catholic teaching and practice.

=== Towards the Virgin Mary ===
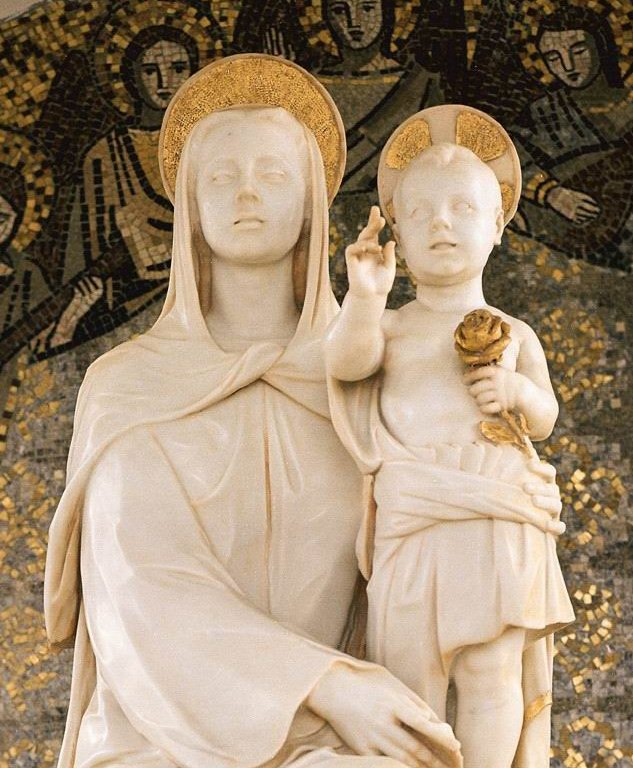
Mother of Fair Love, a gift of Josemaría Escrivá to the University of Navarra: John Paul II stated: "Love for our Lady is a constant characteristic of the life of Josemaría Escrivá."

Pope John Paul II stated on Sunday, 6 October 2002, after the Angelus greetings: "Love for our Lady is a constant characteristic of the life of Josemaría Escrivá and is an eminent part of the legacy that he left to his spiritual sons and daughters." The Pope also said that "St. Josemaría wrote a beautiful small book called The Holy Rosary which presents spiritual childhood, a real disposition of spirit of those who wish to attain total abandonment to the divine will".

When Escrivá was 10 or 11 years old, he already had the habit of carrying the rosary in his pocket. As a priest, he would ordinarily end his homilies and his personal prayer with a conversation with the Blessed Virgin. He instructed that all rooms in the offices of Opus Dei should have an image of the Virgin. He encouraged his spiritual children to greet these images when they entered a room. He encouraged a Marian apostolate, preaching that "To Jesus we go and to Him we return through Mary". While looking at a picture of the Virgin of Guadalupe giving a rose to San Juan Diego, he commented: "I would like to die that way." On 26 June 1975, after entering his work room, which had a painting of the Virgin of Guadalupe, he slumped on the floor and died.

=== Towards people ===
"Escrivá de Balaguer was a very human saint", preached John Paul II. "All those who met him, whatever their culture or social status, felt he was a father, totally devoted to serving others, for he was convinced that every soul is a marvellous treasure; indeed, every person is worth all of Christ's Blood. This attitude of service is obvious in his dedication to his priestly ministry and in the magnanimity with which he started so many works of evangelization and human advancement for the poorest persons."

Former numerary María del Carmen Tapia (1925–2016), who worked with Escrivá for 18 years inside the organization, seven as his personal secretary, claimed in her book Beyond the Threshold: A Life in Opus Dei that Escrivá often lost his temper but that she was not allowed to record anything negative that she witnessed. Tapia also alleged that she was subjected to verbal abuse by Escrivá, who insulted and berated her in the presence of others. According to Tapia, while she was in charge of a female branch of Opus Dei in Venezuela, she was urgently summoned to Rome and then kept as a prisoner in the headquarters of the organization from November 1965 until March 1966, when she was finally compelled to resign from Opus Dei. "I was held completely deprived of any outside contact with the absolute prohibition to go out for any reason or receive or make telephone calls or to write or receive letters. Nor could I go out for the so-called weekly walk or the monthly excursion. I was a prisoner."

However, some of his devotees say that, through him, Opus Dei has been able to better the quality of life of many women, and refer to his respect for women and his interest in improving their lives. Historian Elizabeth Fox-Genovese, a Catholic convert, asserted that "Opus Dei has an enviable record of educating the poor and supporting women, whether single or married, in any occupation they choose."

=== Towards his family ===
Opus Dei's founder modified his name in several ways over the course of his life. In the church records of the cathedral at Barbastro, he appears as having been baptized four days after birth with the given names José María Julián Mariano, and his paternal surname was spelled Escriba. As early as his school days, José Escrivá had "adopted the rather more distinguished version spelled with a "v" rather than a "b." His name is spelled Escrivá in the memento of his first Mass.

On 16 June 1940, the Spanish Boletín Oficial del Estado ("Official State Bulletin") records that Escrivá requested of the government that he be permitted to change his "first surname so that it will be written Escrivá de Balaguer". He justified the petition on the grounds that "the name Escrivá is common in the east coast and in Catalonia, leading to harmful and annoying confusion". On 20 June 1943, when he was 41 years old, the registry book of the Barbastro cathedral and the baptismal certificate of José María were annotated to represent "that the surname Escriba was changed to Escrivá de Balaguer". Balaguer is the name of the town in Catalonia from which Escrivá's paternal family derived.

One of the earliest members of Opus Dei, the Spanish architect Miguel Fisac, who was close to Escrivá for almost twenty years before quitting Opus Dei, wrote that Escrivá had suffered from an inferiority complex because of the contempt with which his family had been treated after his father's company failed. Fisac claimed that this bred in Escrivá a longing for "titles, marquisates, escutcheons", and that he had been delighted to make friends with Carolina Mac-Mahón y Jacquet, the second marchioness of Mac-Mahón. Fisac added that he had heard Escrivá himself tell how, while he was chaplain at the Foundation of Santa Isabel in Madrid, he would often meet aristocratic visitors who would ask, upon learning that his name was Escrivá, whether he belonged to the noble Escrivá de Romaní family, only to turn away coldly when upon learning that he did not.

According to Vásquez de Prada, a writer, Opus Dei member, and official biographer who produced a three-volume biography of Escrivá, the act had nothing to do with ambition but was motivated rather by fairness and loyalty to his family. The main problem is that in Spanish the letters b and v are pronounced in the same way and therefore bureaucrats and clerics had made mistakes in transcribing the Escrivá family name in some official documents throughout the generations. Defenders of Escrivá have also argued that the addition of "de Balaguer" corresponded to a practice adopted by many Spanish families that felt a need to distinguish themselves from others with the same surname but proceeding from different regions.

Escrivá's younger brother Santiago stated that his brother "loved the members of his family" and took good care of them. When their father died, he says, Escrivá told their mother that "she should stay calm, because he will always take care of us. And he fulfilled this promise." Escrivá would find time in his busy schedule to chat and take a walk with his younger brother, acting like a father towards him. When the family transferred to Madrid, he obeyed the instructions of their father that he obtain a doctorate in Law. "Thanks to his docility to this advice", says Santiago, "he was able to support the family by giving classes in Law, and with this he acquired a juridical mentality ... which would later be so necessary to do Opus Dei." Escrivá also modified his first name. From José María, he changed it to the original Josemaría. Biographers state, that around 1935 [age 33], "he joined his first two names because his single love for the Virgin Mary and Saint Joseph were equally inseparable".

Sociologist Joan Estruch argues that there is some evidence that Escrivá attempted to erase his humble origins. He notes, for instance, that Escrivá's room in the house in the Barrio de Salamanca, in Madrid, was preserved exactly as it was when Escrivá lived there in the 1940s, while the home in which he was born in Barbastro was deliberately torn down and replaced by a new building that houses an Opus Dei center.

=== Towards his country ===
Many of his contemporaries recount the tendency of Escrivá to preach about patriotism as opposed to nationalism. Critics have alleged that Escrivá personally, as well as the organization of Opus Dei, were associated originally with the ideology of "National Catholicism", particularly during the Spanish Civil War and the years immediately after it, and that they were therefore also closely associated with the authoritarian regime of General Franco. According to Catalan sociologist Joan Estruch:

More than "a classic of the spirituality of all time", Escrivá de Balaguer is at bottom a child of his time: he is the product of a specific country, a specific epoch, a specific church. These are the Spain of General Franco and the church of Pope Pius X. If Opus Dei had "never seen the need to bring itself up to date", as Escrivá maintained, Opus would today be a paramilitary, pro-fascist, antimodernist, integralist (reactionary) organization. If it is not, it is because it has evolved over time, just as the Catholic Church, the Franco regime, and Msgr. Escrivá himself evolved.

Estruch cites, for instance, the fact that the first edition of Escrivá's The Way, finished in Burgos and published in Valencia in 1939, had the dateline Año de la Victoria ("Year of the Victory"), referring to Franco's military triumph over the Republican forces in the civil war, as well as a prologue by a pro-Franco bishop, Xavier Lauzurica, which ended with the admonition to the reader to "always stay vigilant and alert, because the enemy does not sleep. If you make these maxims your life, you will be a perfect imitator of Jesus Christ and a gentleman without blemish. And with Christs like you Spain will return to the old grandeur of its saints, wise men, and heroes." Escrivá preached personally to General Franco and his family during a week-long spiritual retreat at the Pardo Palace (Franco's official residence) in April 1946.

Vittorio Messori says that the ties between Escrivá and Francoism are part of a black legend propagated against Escrivá and Opus Dei. Allen states that based on his research Escrivá could not be said to be pro-Franco (for which he was criticized for not joining other Catholics in openly praising Franco) nor anti-Franco (for which he was criticized for not being "pro-democracy"). According to Allen, there is no statement from Escrivá for or against Franco. Escrivá's devotees and some historians have emphasized his personal effort to avoid partiality in politics. Professor Peter Berglar, a German historian, asserts that Franco's falangists suspected Escrivá of "internationalism, anti-Spainism and Freemasonry" and that during "the first decade of Franco's regime, Opus Dei and Escrivá were attacked with perseverance bordering on fanaticism, not by enemies, but by supporters of the new Spanish State. Escrivá was even reported to the Tribunal for the Fight against Freemasonry".

=== Awards and honors ===
Escrivá received several awards:

- The Grand Cross of Alfonso X the Wise (1951)
- The Gold Cross of St. Raymond of Penyafort (1954)
- The Grand Cross of Isabella the Catholic (1956)
- The Grand Cross of Charles III (1960)
- Doctor Honoris Causa by the University of Zaragoza (Spain, 1960)
- The Gold Medal by the City council of Barbastro (1975).

Some biographers associated with Opus Dei have said that Escrivá did not seek these awards, that they were nevertheless granted to him, that he accepted them due to charity to those who were granting these, and that he did not give the slightest importance to these awards. Journalist Luis Carandell, however, recounts testimonies about how members of Opus Dei paid for the insignia of the Grand Cross of Charles III to be made from gold, only to have Escrivá angrily reject it and demand instead one encrusted with diamonds. Carandell holds that this episode was part of a larger pattern in Escrivá's life of ambition for social prestige and the trappings of wealth. Sympathetic biographers, however, insist that Escrivá taught that material things are good, but that people should not get attached to them and should serve only God. It is reported that he declared that "he has most who needs least" and that it took only 10 minutes to gather his possessions after his death.

== Controversies ==
In addition to the questions raised about the depth of Escrivá's spirituality and theological thinking, his purported habits of secretiveness and elitism (although for the most part, Opus Dei faithful belong to the middle-to-low levels of society, in terms of education, income and social status), his alleged bad temper and ambition for social status and worldly luxuries, several other specific aspects of Escrivá's life and work have generated some criticism, particularly regarding his canonization by the Catholic Church. The sources of criticism include his alleged private statements in defence of Adolf Hitler, collaboration by members of Opus Dei with right-wing political causes (especially during General Francisco Franco's dictatorship in Spain), Escrivá's request for the rehabilitation in his favour of an aristocratic title and allegations that he maintained bad relations with other Catholic officials, of whom he could be very critical in private.

=== Alleged defence of Hitler ===
During Escrivá's beatification process, Vladimir Felzmann, who had been Escrivá's personal assistant before Felzmann quit Opus Dei and became a priest of the Archdiocese of Westminster and an aide to Cardinal Basil Hume, sent several letters to Flavio Capucci, the postulator (i.e., chief promoter) of Escrivá's cause. In his letters, Felzmann wrote that in 1967 or 1968, during the intermission to a World War II movie, Escrivá had said to him, "Vlad, Hitler couldn't have been such a bad person. He couldn't have killed six million. It couldn't have been more than four million". Felzmann later explained that those remarks should be regarded in the context of Catholic anticommunism in Spain, emphasizing that in 1941 all of the male members of Opus Dei, who then numbered about fifty, offered to join the "Blue Division", a group of Spaniard volunteers who joined the German forces in their fight against the Soviet Army, along the Eastern Front. Another phrase that has been attributed to Escrivá by some of his critics is "Hitler against the Jews, Hitler against the Slavs, means Hitler against Communism". Álvaro del Portillo, who succeeded Escrivá as the director of Opus Dei, declared that any claims that Escrivá endorsed Hitler were "a patent falsehood" and part of "a slanderous campaign". He and others have stated that Escrivá regarded Hitler as a "pagan", a "racist" and a "tyrant".

=== Alleged support for right-wing leaders ===
One of the most controversial accusations against Escrivá is that he and Opus Dei were active in bolstering far-right regimes, especially the dictatorship of General Francisco Franco in Spain. After 1957, several members of Opus Dei served as ministers in Franco's government. In particular, the "technocrats" most associated with the "Spanish miracle" of the 1960s were members of Opus Dei: Alberto Ullastres, Mariano Navarro Rubio, Gregorio López-Bravo, Laureano López Rodó, Juan José Espinosa, and Faustino García-Moncó. Most of these "technocrats" entered the government under the patronage of Admiral Luis Carrero Blanco who, though not a member of Opus Dei himself, was reportedly sympathetic to the organization and its values and who, as Franco grew older and more frail, increasingly came to exercise the day-to-day control of the Spanish government.

According to journalist Luis Carandell, when Ullastres and Navarro Rubio were first appointed to the government in 1957, Escrivá gleefully exclaimed "They have made us ministers!" something which Opus Dei has officially denied. On 23 May 1958, Escrivá sent a letter to Franco, which said, in part:

Although a stranger to any political activity, I cannot help but rejoice as a priest and Spaniard that the Chief of State’s authoritative voice should proclaim that, "The Spanish nation considers it a badge of honour to accept the law of God according to the one and true doctrine of the Holy Catholic Church, inseparable faith of the national conscience which will inspire its legislation." It is in fidelity to our people’s Catholic tradition that the best guarantee of success in acts of government, the certainty of a just and lasting peace within the national community, as well as the divine blessing for those holding positions of authority, will always be found. I ask God our Lord to bestow upon your Excellency with every sort felicity and impart abundant grace to carry out the grave mission entrusted to you.

In 1963, Swiss Catholic theologian Hans Urs von Balthasar wrote a scathing critique of Escrivá's spirituality, characterizing Escrivá's approach to religion as a form of "integrism", stating "despite the affirmations of the members of Opus Dei that they are free in their political options, it is undeniable that its foundation is marked by Francoism, that that is the 'law within which it has been formed'". In another essay, published the following year, von Balthasar characterized Opus Dei as "an integrist concentration of power within the Church", explaining that the main objective of integrism is "imposing the spiritual with worldly means".

In 1979, von Balthasar distanced himself from a newspaper attack on Opus Dei which had cited his earlier accusations of integrism. He wrote in a personal letter to the Prelature, sent also to the Neue Zürcher Zeitung, that "because of my lack of concrete information, I am not able to give an informed opinion about Opus Dei today. On the other hand, one thing strikes me as obvious: many of the criticisms levelled against the movement, including those of your own journal concerning the religious instruction given by Opus Dei members, seem to me to be false and anti-clerical." Von Balthasar maintained his unfavourable judgment of Escrivá's spirituality and repeated it in a television interview in 1984, but he did not renew his criticism of Opus Dei as an organization. In 1988, von Balthasar was named as a cardinal by Pope John Paul II, but he died before he could be elevated to that position at the next consistory. In response to the accusations of "integrism", Escrivá declared that, "Opus Dei is neither on the left nor on the right nor in the centre" and that "as regards religious liberty, from its foundation Opus Dei has never practised discrimination of any kind."

Opus Dei officials state that individual members are free to choose any political affiliation, emphasizing that among its members were also two important figures in the monarchist political opposition of the 1970s in Spain: the writer Rafael Calvo Serer, who was forced into exile by Franco's regime, and the journalist Antonio Fontán, who became the first president of the Senate after the transition to democracy. John Allen has written that Escrivá was neither anti-Franco nor pro-Franco. Some critics of Opus Dei, such as Miguel Fisac and Damian Thompson, have argued that the group has always sought "advancement not only of its message but also of its interests", and that it has consistently courted those with power and influence, without maintaining a coherent political ideology. The alleged involvement of Opus Dei in Latin American politics has also been a topic of controversy. According to US journalist Penny Lernoux, the 1966 military coup in Argentina happened soon after its leader, General Juan Carlos Onganía, attended a spiritual retreat sponsored by Opus Dei. During his 1974 visit to Latin America, Escrivá visited Chile, only nine months after the coup d'état in Chile that deposed the elected Marxist president Salvador Allende and installed a right-wing military dictatorship under General Augusto Pinochet. Escrivá declined an invitation to visit personally with the Chilean government junta, alleging that he was ill with influenza, but in his letter to the members of the junta he added that he wished "to let you know how much I pray, have prayed, and have gotten others to pray, for this great nation, especially when it found itself menaced by the scourge of the Marxist heresy."

Critics have charged that Opus Dei members supported Pinochet's coup and then had a role in the "Miracle of Chile" of the 1980s similar to that of the "technocrats" during the Spanish Miracle of the 1960s. However, among the major right-wing politicians, only Joaquín Lavín (who did not occupy public office under Pinochet) has been unequivocally identified as a member of Opus Dei. Another member of Opus Dei, Jorge Sabag Villalobos, belongs to a centre-left party that opposed Pinochet's regime. Peter Berglar, a German historian and member of Opus Dei, has written that connecting Opus Dei with fascist regimes is a "gross slander". Journalist Noam Friedlander states that allegations about Opus Dei involvement with the Pinochet regime are "unproven tales." Several of Escrivá's collaborators stated that he actually despised dictatorships. Escrivá's visit to Chile and the subsequent spread of Opus Dei in the country has been identified by some historians as one strand of a wider phenomenon of influence from Francoist Spain in Chile.

=== Title of nobility ===
Another source of controversy about Escrivá was the fact that, in 1968, he requested and received from the Spanish Ministry of Justice the rehabilitation in his favor of the aristocratic title of Marquess of Peralta. According to the official Guía de grandezas y títulos del reino ("Guide to the grandeeships and titles of the realm"), the title of Marquess had originally been granted in 1718 to Tomás de Peralta, minister of state, justice and war for the Kingdom of Naples, by Archduke Charles of Austria. Until 1715, Archduke Charles had been, as "Charles III", a pretender to the Spanish throne (see War of Spanish Succession), and from 1711 until 1740 he ruled as Holy Roman Emperor and King of Naples.

Escrivá's successful petition of a title of nobility has aroused controversy not only because it might seem at odds with the humility befitting a Catholic priest, but also because the same title of Marquess of Peralta had been rehabilitated in 1883 by Pope Leo XIII and King Alfonso XII in favor of a man to whom Escrivá had no male-line family association: the Costa Rican diplomat Manuel María de Peralta y Alfaro (1847–1930). On that occasion, the documents ordering the rehabilitation stated that the original title had been granted in 1738 (not 1718) to Juan Tomás de Peralta y Franco de Medina, by Charles of Austria in his capacity as Holy Roman Emperor, not as pretender to the Spanish throne. Ambassador Peralta, who in 1884 had married a Belgian countess, Jehanne de Clérembault, died without children in 1930. None of his kinsmen in Costa Rica requested the transmission of the marquessate, but one of them has published an extensive genealogical study that would seem to contradict any claim by Escrivá to the title.

Escrivá did not publicly use the title of Marquess of Peralta and finally ceded it to his brother Santiago in 1972. Santiago said of the request to rehabilitate the title that "the decision was heroic because [Josemaría] knew that he would be vilified as a result... Josemaría did what is best for me. After the right amount of time had passed, without making use of the title (in fact he never had the intention of using it), he passed the title on to me." The argument that Mons. Escrivá had originally requested the rehabilitation of the title as a favor to his family and with the intention of ceding it to his brother seems belied by the fact that, in 1968, Santiago had requested for himself the rehabilitation of a different title of nobility, the barony of San Felipe, which was not granted. According to historian Ricardo de la Cierva (a former Minister of Culture in the Spanish government) and to architect Miguel Fisac (who had been close to Escrivá and member of Opus Dei from 1936 until his departure in 1955), Escrivá's request for the title might have been part of an unsuccessful attempt to take control of the Sovereign Military Order of Malta (SMOM), a Catholic religious order which required its leading members to be of noble birth and to which his deputy in Opus Dei, Álvaro del Portillo, already belonged. According to de la Cierva, "Monsignor Escrivá's desire for a marquessate is not to my liking but seems to me, given his idiosyncrasies, comprehensible and even forgivable. That the title should have been based on a falsification seems to me extremely sad and even extremely grave."

=== Relations with other Catholic leaders ===
Joan Estruch, professor of sociology at Autonomous University of Barcelona, writes that Escrivá and Opus Dei came into conflict in the 1940s with the Jesuits and with the Asociación Católica de Propagandistas ("Catholic Association of Propagandists") as they competed for ascendancy over young Catholics in university and in government in the Spain of the "First Francoism". Pauline priest Giancarlo Rocca, a church historian and a professor at the Claretianum in Rome, says that Escrivá actively sought the rank of bishop but was twice refused by the Vatican curia, first in 1945, and later in 1950 (when he and his followers had lobbied for his appointment as bishop of Vitoria). According to Rocca, in both instances the curial officials expressed concerns about the organization of Opus Dei and about the psychological profile of Escrivá.

Sociologist Alberto Moncada, a former member of Opus Dei, has collected and published various oral testimonies about Escrivá's strained relations with other officials of the Catholic Church. In particular, Moncada quotes Antonio Pérez-Tenessa, who at the time was secretary general of Opus Dei in Rome, as witnessing Escrivá's intense displeasure over the election of Pope Paul VI in 1963, and later expressing doubts in private about the salvation of the Pope's soul. According to María del Carmen Tapia, who worked with Escrivá in Rome, the founder of Opus Dei had "no respect" for Popes John XXIII or Paul VI and believed that his own organization of Opus Dei was "above the Church in holiness."

Luigi de Magistris, at the time the regent of the Vatican's Apostolic Penitentiary, wrote in a 1989 confidential vote asking for the suspension of the proceedings for Escrivá's beatification, that "it is not a mystery that there were serious tensions" between Escrivá and the Jesuits. De Magistris then alluded to Escrivá distancing himself from the Jesuit priest Valentino Sánchez, who had previously been Escrivá's confessor, over the Jesuits' opposition to the proposed constitutions of Opus Dei. Journalist Luis Carandell says that, during his years in Rome, Escrivá kept his distance from the Jesuit Superior General, the Spaniard Pedro Arrupe, to the extent that Arrupe once joked with Antonio Riberi, the apostolic nuncio to Spain, about doubting whether Escrivá really existed.

According to Alberto Moncada, Escrivá's years in Rome were dedicated in large part to his campaign to make Opus Dei independent from the authority of diocesan bishops and of the Vatican curia, something which was finally achieved, after Escrivá's death, with the establishment in 1982, by Pope John Paul II, of Opus Dei as a personal prelature, subject only to its own prelate and to the Pope. As such, Opus Dei is currently the only personal prelature in the Catholic Church, although this juridical figure ―similar in nature to other kinds of hierarchical organization in the church's history, such as military and personal ordinariates― is fruit of the Second Vatican Council's aim to provide pastoral attention in ways more suited to the actual situation of many of its faithful. In this way, its work complements that of the dioceses, and in some cases even takes the form of a more direct collaboration: for example, when priests of Opus Dei assume pastoral care of parishes at the request of the local bishops. Escrivá may have had this in mind when he wrote, "The only ambition, the only desire of Opus Dei and each of its members is to serve the Church as the Church wants to be served, within the specific vocation God has given us." Membership in the prelature does not exempt a Catholic from the authority of the local diocesan bishop.

=== Opus claims ===
In 2024, Simon and Schuster published the book Opus by Gareth Gore, which was sharply critical of Escrivá and the organization he founded. According to the book, Escrivá expected Opus Dei priests to use information gleaned from confessions to create detailed records about its members. The book similarly reports that Escrivá had microphones installed in the rooms of his guests and followers so he could eavesdrop on their private conversations. Opus Dei disputed the depiction in Opus, publishing a 106-page rebuttal.

== Beatification and canonization ==
After the death of Escrivá de Balaguer on 26 June 1975, the Postulation for the Cause of his beatification and canonization received many testimonies and postulatory letters from people all over the world. On the fifth anniversary of Escrivá's death, the Postulation solicited the initiation of the cause of beatification from the Vatican Congregation for the Causes of Saints. One-third of the world's bishops (an unprecedented number) petitioned for Escrivá's beatification.

His cause for beatification was introduced in Rome on 19 February 1981 on the strength of the apparently miraculous cure in 1976 of a rare disease, lipomatosis, suffered by Sister Concepción Boullón Rubio, whose family had prayed to Escrivá to help her. On 9 April 1990, Pope John Paul II declared that Escrivá possessed Christian virtues to a "heroic degree", and on 6 July 1991 the Board of Physicians for the Congregation of the Causes of Saints unanimously accepted the cure of Sister Rubio. Escrivá was beatified in Rome, together with the Sudanese nun Josephine Bakhita, in a ceremony conducted by John Paul II on 17 May 1992.

By way of a letter dated 15 March 1993, the Postulation for the Cause received news about the miraculous cure of Dr. Manuel Nevado Rey from cancerous chronic radiodermatitis, an incurable disease, which took place in November 1992. The reported miracle, apparently brought about by Escrivá's intervention, was ruled valid by the Congregation for the Causes of Saints and approved by Pope John Paul II in December 2001, enabling the canonization of Escrivá. John Paul II, who frequently expressed public endorsement of Opus Dei and its work, canonized Escrivá on 6 October 2002. The canonization Mass was attended by 42 cardinals and 470 bishops from around the world, general superiors of many orders and religious congregations, and representatives of various Catholic groups. During the days of the canonization event, church officials commented on the validity of the message of the founder, repeating John Paul II's decree Christifideles Omnes on Escrivá's virtues, which said that "by inviting Christians to be united to God through their daily work, which is something men will have to do and find their dignity in as long as the world lasts, the timeliness of this message is destined to endure as an inexhaustible source of spiritual light, regardless of changing epochs and situations."

=== Criticism of the process ===
Various critics questioned the rapidity of Escrivá's canonization. On the eve of Escrivá's beatification in 1992, journalist William D. Montalbano, writing for the Los Angeles Times, described it as "perhaps the most contentious beatification in modern times." Critics have argued that the process was plagued by irregularities. However, endorsers refer to Rafael Pérez, an Augustinian priest who presided over the tribunal in Madrid for Escrivá's cause, as "one of the best experts" on canonization. Pérez stated that the process was fast because Escrivá's figure is "of the universal importance," the Postulators "knew what they were doing", and, in 1983, the procedures were simplified in order to present "models who lived in a world like ours." Flavio Capucci, the postulator, also reported that the 6,000 postulatory letters to the Vatican showed "earnestness".

Escrivá's canonization was one of the first to be processed after the 1983 Code of Canon Law streamlined the procedures for canonization, and so it was processed more quickly than was typical before. Mother Teresa was canonized even more quickly, having been beatified just 6 years after her death (Escrivá was beatified in 17 years). According to journalist Kenneth L. Woodward, the 6,000-page long positio (the official document about the life and work of the candidate for sainthood prepared by the postulators) was declared confidential, but leaked to the press in 1992, after Escrivá's beatification. Woodward declared that, of 2,000 pages of testimonies, about 40% are by either Álvaro del Portillo or Javier Echevarría Rodríguez who, as successors of Escrivá at the head of Opus Dei, would have the most to gain from the Catholic Church recognizing that organization's founder as a saint. The only critical testimony quoted in the positio was by Alberto Moncada, a Spanish sociologist who had been a member of Opus Dei and whose testimony might have been easier for the church authorities to dismiss because he had had little personal contact with Escrivá and had left the Catholic Church altogether. This critical testimony covered a mere two pages.

Critics of the process also questioned the fact that some of the physicians involved in the authentication of the two "scientifically inexplicable cures" achieved through the posthumous intercession of Escrivá, such as Dr. Raffaello Cortesini (a heart surgeon), were themselves members of Opus Dei. The Vatican has stated that the Medical Consultants for the Congregation affirmed unanimously that the miraculous cure of a cancerous state of chronic radiodermatitis in its third and irreversible stage in Dr. Manuel Nevado Rey (a country doctor in the village of Almendralejo) was "very quick, complete, lasting and scientifically inexplicable." After six months, the theological consultants, according to the Vatican, also unanimously attributed this cure to Escrivá. On the year of his canonization, the Opus Dei prelate reported that the Postulation has gathered 48 reports of unexplained medical favors attributed to Escriva's intercession, as well as 100,000 ordinary favours.

Former Opus Dei members critical of Escrivá's character who say that they were refused a hearing during the beatification and canonization processes include Miguel Fisac (a well-known Spanish architect who was one of the earliest members of Opus Dei and remained an associate of Escrivá for nearly twenty years), Vladimir Felzmann (a Czech-born engineer and Catholic priest from the UK, who was Escrivá's personal assistant), María del Carmen Tapia (who worked with Escrivá in Opus Dei's central offices in Rome and directed its printing press), Carlos Albás (a Spanish lawyer who was also Escrivá's first cousin once removed), María Angustias Moreno (who was an official of the women's part of Opus Dei, during Escrivá's lifetime), and John Roche (an Irish physicist and historian of science who was a member of Opus Dei from 1959 to 1973, and managed one of its schools in Kenya). Several groups critical of Escrivá and of Opus Dei emerged both before and after the canonization of Escrivá, including the Opus Dei Awareness Network (ODAN), and "OpusLibros", both collaborations of former members who now oppose Opus Dei and its practices. According to journalist Kenneth L. Woodward, before the official beatification, he

was able to interview six other men and women who had lived and/or worked closely with Escrivá. The examples they gave of vanity, venality, temper tantrums, harshness toward subordinates, and criticism of popes and other churchmen were hardly the characteristics one expects to find in a Christian saint. But their testimony was not allowed to be heard. At least two of them were vilified in the positio by name, yet neither of them was permitted to defend their reputations.

Catholic theologian Richard McBrien termed Escrivá's sainthood "the most blatant example of a politicized [canonization] in modern times." According to Catholic writer and biographer John Allen such views are countered by many other ex-members, the present members, and the estimated 900,000 people who attend activities of Opus Dei. He says that the interpretation of the facts "seems to depend upon one's basic approach to spirituality, family life, and the implications of a religious vocation." Allen's account of Opus Dei and its founder, however, was not accepted by all reviewers as impartial.

=== Reports of discord among judges ===
Escrivá's canonization attracted an unusual amount of attention and criticism, both within the Catholic Church and by the press. Flavio Capucci, the postulator of Escrivá's cause for sainthood, summarized the main accusations against Escrivá: that "he had a bad temper, that he was cruel, that he was vain, that he was close to Spanish dictator Francisco Franco, that he was pro-Nazi and that he was so dismayed by the Second Vatican Council that he even travelled to Greece with the idea that he might convert to the Orthodox religion".

A Newsweek article by Woodward stated that, of the nine judges of the Congregation for the Causes of Saints presiding over Escrivá's cause for beatification, two had requested a suspension of the proceedings. The dissenters were identified as Luigi De Magistris, a prelate working in the Vatican's tribunal of the Apostolic Penitentiary, and Justo Fernández Alonso, rector of the Spanish National Church in Rome. According to Woodward, one of the dissenters wrote that the beatification of Escrivá could cause the church "grave public scandal." The same article quoted Cardinal Silvio Oddi as declaring that many bishops were "very displeased" with the rush to canonize Escrivá so soon after his death. In interviews, José Saraiva Martins, Cardinal Prefect of the Congregation for the Causes of Saints, has denied being aware of that dissent.

The journal Il Regno, published in Bologna by the congregation of the Priests of the Sacred Heart (the Dehonians), reproduced, in May 1992, the confidential vote of one of the judges in Escrivá's cause of beatification, in which the judge asked that the process be suspended. The document questioned the haste of the proceedings, the near absence of testimony from critics in the documentation gathered by the postulators, the failure of the documentation to properly address issues about Escrivá's relations with the Franco regime and with other Catholic organizations, and suggestions from the official testimonies themselves that Escrivá lacked proper spiritual humility. This document does not identify the judge by name, but its author indicates that he met Escrivá only once, briefly, in 1966, while serving as a notary for the Holy Office, which implies that the judge in question was De Magistris.

As regent of the Apostolic Penitentiary, at the time of the vote De Magistris's work was largely concerned with issues arising from confession and penance. According to church law, a confessor has an absolute duty not to disclose anything that he might have learned from a penitent in the course of a confession (see Seal of confession in the Catholic Church). In his vote, which its own contents date to August 1989, De Magistris argued that the testimony from the main witness, Álvaro del Portillo, should have been entirely excluded from the proceedings, since Portillo had been Escrivá's confessor for 31 years.

John Allen Jr. comments that, according to some observers within the Catholic Church, De Magistris was punished for his opposition to Escrivá's canonization. De Magistris was promoted in 2001 to the head of the Apostolic Penitentiary, an important position in the Roman Curia usually occupied by a cardinal. However, Pope John Paul II did not make De Magistris a cardinal and replaced him as head of the Apostolic Penitentiary after less than two years, effectively forcing him into retirement. The decision by Pope Francis to make De Magistris a cardinal at the consistory of 14 February 2015, when De Magistris was about to turn 89 and therefore could no longer participate in papal conclaves, was interpreted by some commentators as consolation for how De Magistris had been treated under John Paul II.

== Teachings and legacy ==
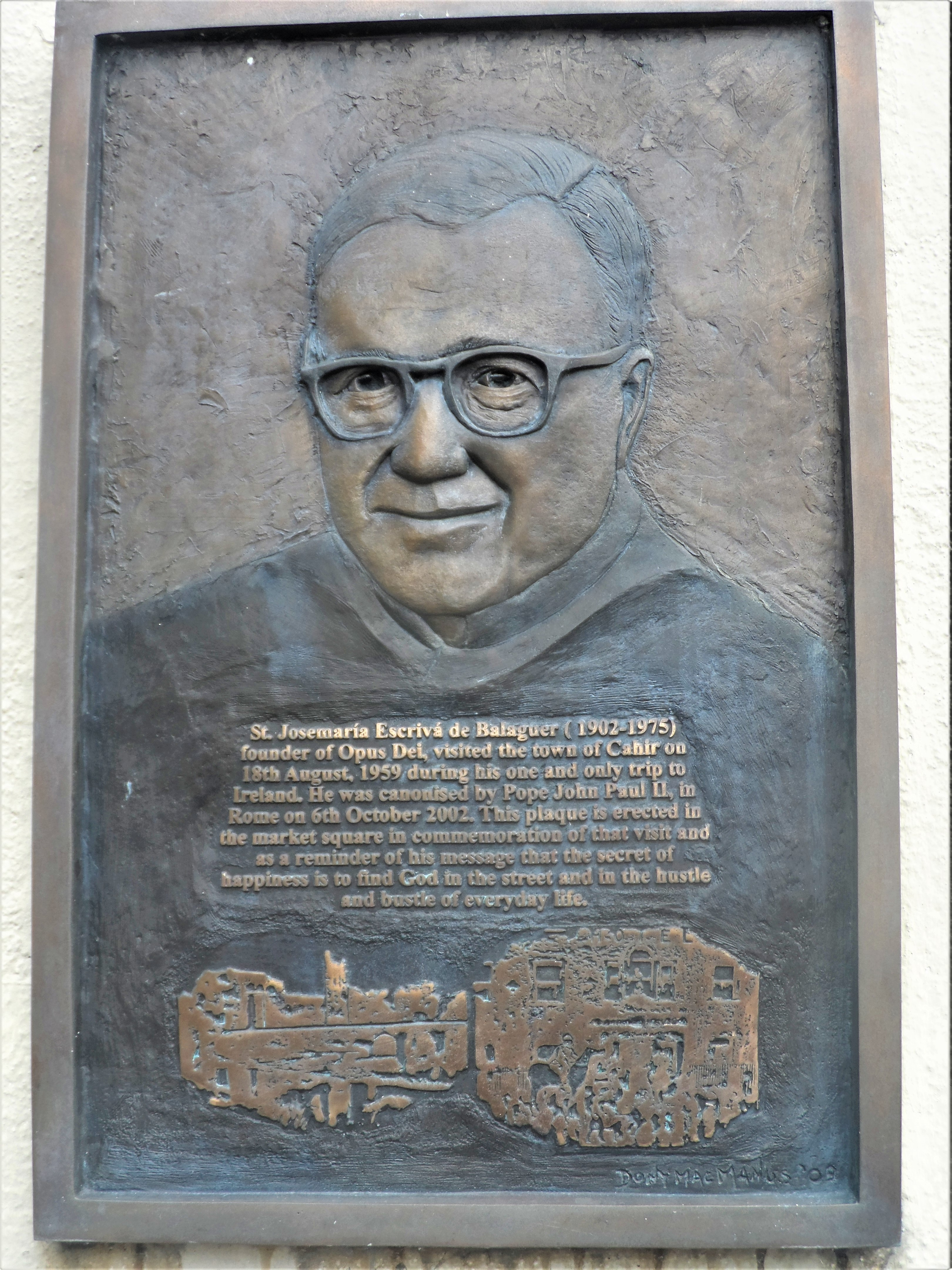
Bronze portrait of Escrivá in Cahir, Ireland, commemorating a visit he made in 1959

The significance of Escrivá's message and teachings has been a topic of debate, by Catholics and others. The Catholic theologian Hans Urs von Balthasar, who was appointed cardinal by Pope John Paul II (but died in 1988 before his investiture), dismissed Escrivá's principal work, The Way, as "a little Spanish manual for advanced Boy Scouts" and argued that it was quite insufficient to sustain a major religious movement. The Spanish philosopher José Luis López Aranguren wrote in 1965 that The Way was ultimately a book of "Ignatian asceticism", but "unbelievably trivialized". On the other hand, the monk and spiritual writer Thomas Merton declared that Escrivá's book "will certainly do a great deal of good by its simplicity, which is the true medium for the Gospel message". The Protestant French historian Pierre Chaunu, a professor at the Sorbonne and president of the Académie des Sciences Morales et Politiques, said that "the work of Escrivá de Balaguer will undoubtedly mark the 21st century. This is a prudent and reasonable wager. Do not pass close to this contemporary without paying him close attention".

Critics of Opus Dei have often argued that the importance and originality of Escrivá's intellectual contributions to theology, history, and law, at least as measured by his published writings, has been grossly exaggerated by his devotees. However, various officials of the Catholic Church have spoken well of Escrivá's influence and of the relevance of his teachings. In the decree introducing the cause of beatification and canonization of Escrivá, Cardinal Ugo Poletti wrote in 1981: "For having proclaimed the universal call to holiness since he founded Opus Dei during 1928, Msgr. Josemaría Escrivá de Balaguer, has been unanimously recognized as the precursor of precisely what constitutes the fundamental nucleus of the Church's magisterium, a message of such fruitfulness in the life of the Church." Sebastiano Baggio, Cardinal Prefect of the Congregation for Bishops, wrote a month after Escrivá's death: "It is evident even today that the life, works, and message of the founder of Opus Dei constitutes a turning point, or more exactly a new original chapter in the history of Christian spirituality." A Vatican peritus or consultor for the process of beatification said that "he is like a figure from the deepest spiritual sources". Franz König, Archbishop of Vienna, wrote in 1975:

"The magnetic force of Opus Dei probably comes from its profoundly lay spirituality. At the very beginning, in 1928, Msgr. Escrivá anticipated the return to the Patrimony of the Church brought by the Second Vatican Council ... [H]e was able to anticipate the great themes of the Church's pastoral action in the dawn of the third millennium of her history." The "absolutely central" part of Escrivá's teaching, says American theologian William May, is that "sanctification is possible only because of the grace of God, freely given to his children through his only-begotten Son, and it consists essentially in an intimate, loving union with Jesus, our Redeemer and Savior."

Escrivá's books, including Furrow, The Way, Christ is Passing By, and The Forge, continue to be read widely, and emphasize the laity's calling to daily sanctification (a message also to be found in the documents of Vatican II). Pope John Paul II made the following observation in his homily at the beatification of Escrivá:

With supernatural intuition, Blessed Josemaría untiringly preached the universal call to holiness and apostolate. Christ calls everyone to become holy in the realities of everyday life. Hence work too is a means of personal holiness and apostolate, when it is done in union with Jesus Christ.

John Paul II's decree Christifideles omnes states: "By inviting Christians to seek union with God through their daily work — which confers dignity on human beings and is their lot as long as they exist on earth — his message is destined to endure as an inexhaustible source of spiritual light regardless of changing epochs and situations".

== Writings ==
- Escrivá, Josemaría (2002), The Way, Leominster: Gracewing, ISBN 978-0-85244-566-2
- Escrivá, Josemaría (1987), Furrow, Princeton: Scepter Publishers, ISBN 0-906138-13-2
- Escrivá, Josemaría (2003), The Forge, Princeton: Scepter Publishers, ISBN 0-933932-56-1
- Escrivá, Josemaría; Balaguer, Jose (2002), Conversations with Monsignor Josemaría Escrivá, Princeton: Scepter Publishers, ISBN 978-1-889334-58-5
- Escrivá, Josemaría (2007), Conversations with Saint Josemaria Escriva, Princeton: Scepter Publishers, ISBN 978-1-59417-057-7
- Escrivá, Josemaría (1981), Friends of God, Princeton: Scepter, ISBN 0-906138-02-7
- Escrivá, Josemaría (1982), Christ Is Passing by, Sydney: Little Hills Press, ISBN 0-933932-04-9
- Escrivá, Josemaría (1989), In Love with the Church, Lincoln: London, ISBN 0-906138-26-4
- Escrivá, Josemaría (2001), Holy Rosary, Princeton: Scepter, ISBN 1-889334-44-8
- Escrivá, Josemaría (2018), Novena to Our Lady of Students, Downers Grove: St. Josemaria Institute, ISBN 978-1-962548-54-0
- Escrivá, Josemaría (2018), Novena for Work to St. Josemaria Escriva, Downers Grove: St. Josemaria Institute, ISBN 978-1-962548-55-7
- Escrivá, Josemaría (2018), Novena for a Happy and Faithful Marriage, Downers Grove: St. Josemaria Institute, ISBN 978-1-936045-67-9
- Escrivá, Josemaría (2018), Praying the Stations of the Cross with St. Josemaria Escriva, Downers Grove: St. Josemaria Institute, ISBN 978-1-948139-47-2
- Escrivá, Josemaría (2021), Praying the Holy Rosary with St. Josemaria Escriva, Downers Grove: Midwest Theological Forum, ISBN 978-1-890177-42-3
- Escrivá, Josemaría (2018), The Way of the Cross, Princeton: Scepter Publishers, ISBN 9781910644027
- Escrivá, Josemaría (2018), Novena para ser felices y fieles en el matrimonio, Downers Grove: St. Josemaria Institute, ISBN 978-1-948139-80-9

== See also ==
- Catholic Church in Spain
- List of Catholic saints
- List of saints canonized by Pope John Paul II
- Opus Dei
- Opus Dei and politics
- The Way
- There Be Dragons

== Bibliography ==
Opus Dei members

- Vázquez de Prada, Andrés (2001), The Founder of Opus Dei: the Life of Josemaría Escrivá, Princeton: Scepter Publishers, ISBN 978-1-889334-25-7
- Belda, Manuel, ed. (1997), Holiness and the World: Studies in the Teachings of Blessed Josemariá Escrivá, Princeton: Scepter Publications, ISBN 1-890177-04-0 Collection of contributions to a theological symposium; contributors include Ratzinger, del Portillo, Cottier, dalla Torre, Ocariz, Illanes, Aranda, Burggraf and an address by Pope John Paul II.
- Berglar, Peter (1994), Opus Dei. Life and Work of its Founder, Princeton: Scepter Publishers, ISBN 0-933932-65-0. A study of Opus Dei based on the life story and work of its founder written by a professor of history at the University of Cologne.
- Echevarría Rodríguez, Javier (2000), Memoria del Beato Josemaría Escrivá, Madrid: Ediciones Rialp, ISBN 84-321-3305-1, archived from the original on 9 July 2014
- Gondrand, François (1990), At God's Pace, Princeton: Scepter, ISBN 0-906138-27-2
- Le Tourneau, Dominique (1987), What Is Opus Dei?, Dublin: Mercier Press, ISBN 0-85244-136-3
- del Portillo, Álvaro; Cavalleri, Cesare (1996), Immersed in God: Blessed Josemaría Escrivá, Founder of Opus Dei As Seen by His Successor, Bishop Álvaro Del Portillo, Princeton: Scepter Publishers, ISBN 0-933932-85-5
- Helming, Dennis (1986), Footprints in the Snow. A pictorial biography of the founder of Opus Dei, Princeton: Scepter Publishers, ISBN 0-933932-50-2

Official Catholic Church documents

- Pope John Paul II (9 April 1990), Litterae Decretales — Domine, Ut — Quibus Iosephmariae Escrivá De Balaguer Sanctorum Honores Decernuntur (in Latin), Vatican: Holy See
- Pope John Paul II (9 April 1990), "Litterae Decretales — Domine, Ut — Honors of Sainthood are Decreed for Blessed Josemaría Escrivá", Romana — Bulletin of the Prelature of the Holy Cross and Opus dei, 35 (July), Vatican: Opus Dei: 194
- Angelo Cardinal Felici, ed. (9 April 1990), Cause of canonization of the Servant of God Josemaría Escrivá, Priest, Founder of the Priestly Society of the Holy Cross and Opus Dei (1902-1975), Vatican: Holy See
- Pope John Paul II (7 October 2002), Address in Praise of Saint Josemaría Escrivá, Founder Opus Dei, Vatican: Holy See The speech summarizes Escrivá and Opus Dei's mission, work, message, and the main features of his teachings
- Office of Papal Liturgical Celebrations (2002), "Josemaría Escrivá de Balaguer — Canonization - 6 October 2002", Official website, Vatican: Holy See
- Holy See, Josemaría Escrivá de Balaguer — Chronology of the Cause for Canonization
- Sacred Congregation for the Causes of Saints (21 September 2001), Josemaría Escrivá de Balaguer — The Miracle Approved for the Canonization, Vatican: Holy See, "On December 20, 2001, Pope John Paul II approved the decree issued by the Congregation for the Causes of Saints on a miraculous cure attributed to the intercession of Blessed Josemaría Escrivá. The miracle was the cure of Dr. Manuel Nevado from cancerous chronic radiodermatitis, an incurable disease, which took place in November 1992. The decree opened the doors for the canonization of Blessed Josemaría."

Others

- Carandell, Luis (1992a). Vida y milagros de monseñor Escrivá de Balaguer, fundador del Opus Dei [Life and Miracles of Monsignor Escrivá de Balaguer, Founder of Opus Dei] (in Spanish) (6 ed.). Barcelona: Deriva Editorial. ISBN 9788487981036.
- de la Cierva, Ricardo (1993), "Falsificación del marquesado de Peralta", Los Años Mentidos: Falsificaciones Y Mentiras Sobre La Historia De Espana En El Siglo XX (in Spanish), Toledo: Editorial Fénix, ISBN 978-84-88787-00-2
- Estruch, Joan (1995), Saints and Schemers: Opus Dei and Its Paradoxes, New York: Oxford University Press, ISBN 0-19-508251-6
- Woodward, Kenneth L. (1996), Making Saints: How the Catholic Church Determines Who Becomes a Saint, Who Doesn't, and Why, Touchstone, ISBN 978-0-684-81530-5
- Messori, Vittorio (1997), Opus Dei, Leadership and Vision in Today's Catholic Church, Washington: Regnery Publishing, ISBN 0-89526-450-1
- Allen, John L. (2005), Opus Dei: An Objective Look Behind the Myths and Reality of the Most Controversial Force in the Catholic Church, Garden City: Doubleday, ISBN 0-385-51449-2
- Tapia, María del Carmen (2006), Inside Opus Dei: The True, Unfinished Story, New York: Continuum, ISBN 978-0826419309
- Gore, Gareth (2024), Opus: The Cult of Dark Money, Human Trafficking, and Right-Wing Conspiracy inside the Catholic Church, New York: Simon & Schuster, ISBN 978-1668016145
