= Canonization of Josemaría Escrivá =

Controversial Catholic canonization

The canonization of Josemaría Escrivá, a Spanish Catholic priest and the founder of Opus Dei, took place on October 6, 2002, by Pope John Paul II in St. Peter's Square, Vatican City.

The canonization was controversial for several reasons, including a lack of Spanish judges, the fact that Opus Dei doctors were the ones who certified his miracles, and general criticism surrounding Opus Dei itself.

== History of the Cause of Canonization ==
After Escriva's death on June 26, 1975, the Postulation for the Cause of his beatification and canonization started receiving thousands of reports of favors granted through his intercession; the postulation also received testimonies about his holy life. These came from people all over the world.

In 1980, on the 5th anniversary of Escriva's death, his cause for beatification and canonization was solicited from the Congregation for the Causes of Saints, the official Catholic body that investigates deceased Catholics who may have cause to be beatified, the first step towards a declaration of sainthood.

In 1981, the Congregation granted Escriva's Cause the status of nihil obstat (literally 'nothing against'; having no obstacles to beatification). The Decree opening Escriva's Cause was promulgated by the Cardinal Vicar of the Congregation. On March 14, a tribunal was created by the Archbishop of Madrid, which, along with the tribunal constituted by the Vicariate of Rome, would receive the testimonies of those witnesses who either lived in Spain or preferred to give their testimony in Spanish. On May 12 of the same year, the Roman process on the life and virtues of the Servant of God was opened. This was followed on May 18 by the opening of the process in Madrid under Cardinal Enrique y Tarancon.

In 1982, another tribunal was created to document a miracle attributed to the intercession of the Servant of God. This was presided over by Cardinal Enrique y Tarancon. The miracle had occurred in 1976, with the sudden cure of a Carmelite nun suffering from terminal cancer. On April 3, this tribunal was concluded and a certified copy of the proceedings was sent to the Congregation for the Causes of Saints in Rome.

In 1984, the Madrid process on the life and virtues of the Servant of God under Cardinal Angel Suquía, the new Archbishop of Madrid, was concluded. A complete, certified copy of the proceedings was submitted to the Congregation for the Causes of Saints. On November 20, the Congregation for the Causes of Saints, during its Ordinary Congress, declared that the process on the miracle was valid.

In 1986, the Roman process, also on the life and virtues of the Servant of God, concluded under the Cardinal Vicar of Rome. The Preparation of the Positio, a compilation of documents to be examined by the Congregation for the Causes of Saints, was begun in the same year. The Positio would include the testimonies from both processes (in Rome and Madrid), a critical study on the life and heroic virtues of the Servant of God, testimonies obtained in both tribunals in Rome and Madrid together with abundant documentary appendices. It would be submitted and examined by the Congregation for the Causes of Saints. The material was collected in the Roman and Madrid tribunals, under the direction of Father Ambrogio Eszer, O.P., Relator for the Congregation for the Causes of Saints.

In 1987, a declaration of the validity of the Roman and Madrid processes on the heroic virtues of the Servant of God and their conformity with all legal prescriptions by the Congregation for the Causes of Saints was issued. The following year in June, a submission of the Positio on Escriva's life and virtues was sent to the Congregation for its definitive study. The document contained more than 6,000 pages in 4 volumes.

In September 1989, an affirmative verdict was given by the meeting of theologian consultants at the Congregation. On March 20, 1990, an affirmative verdict was given by the Ordinal Congregation of Cardinals and Bishops. On April 9, the Pope ordered the publication of the Decree on the heroic virtues of the Servant of God. After the promulgation of this Decree, the Postulation could present to the Congregation the Positio of the Madrid process on the proposed miraculous cure.

On June 30, 1990, the Medical Consultants of the Congregation, in their technical report, concluded that the cure could not be explained by natural causes. On July 14, after examining the case, the Meeting of Theologian Consultants affirmed the miraculous character of the cure and attributed its cause directly to the intercession of the Servant of God.

On June 18, 1991, an affirmative verdict on the proposed miracle by the Ordinary Congregation of Cardinals and Bishops was given. On July 6, the Pope promulgated the Decree, which declared the miraculous nature of the cure. Having fulfilled all the legal requirements established for the causes of saints, the Pope decided to proceed to the beatification. Escriva was beatified on May 17, 1992.

=== From beatification to canonization ===
- 1993: News about the miraculous cure of Dr. Manuel Nevado Rey. With the help of Dr. Nevado, the Postulation documented and carried out an exhaustive study on the disease he had suffered. Once the extraordinary character of the cure was clear, on December 30, the Postulation submitted the documentation and petitioned the Bishop of Badajoz (a diocese in Southern Spain) to open a process on the miracle.
- 1994: The diocesan investigation was carried out by the Episcopal Curia of Badajoz from May 12 - July 4. This was followed by a formal study carried out by the Congregation for Causes of the Saints after the diocesan proceedings were sent to Rome.
- 1996: On April 26, Declaration of full compliance by the Congregation that the process of the miracle had fully complied with the prevailing legal norms and praxis (Decree of Validity).
- 1997: On July 10, Unanimous affirmation by the Medical Consultants of the Congregation for the Causes of Saints of Dr. Nevado's cure of a cancerous state of chronic radiodermatitis in its third and irreversible stage to be very quick, complete, lasting and scientifically unexplainable.
- 1998: On January 9, Unanimous affirmation by the Theologian Consultants of the Congregation of the preternatural character of the cure and attributed the disappearance of the disease to the invocation of Blessed Josemaria Escriva de Balaguer.
- 2001: On September 21, Unanimous confirmation of the miracle by the Ordinary Congregation of Cardinal and Bishop members of the Congregation. The decree on the miracle was read before the Pope on December 20.
- 2002: On February 26, the Pope presided over the Ordinary Public Consistory of Cardinals, which gave its approval for the canonization of several Beati. Among them was Blessed Josemaria Escriva, whose canonization date was announced for October 6, 2002.

== Canonization Day ==
Escrivá was canonized by Pope John Paul II on 6 October 2002 in St. Peter's Square in the Vatican.

During the canonization, there were 42 cardinals and 470 bishops from around the world, general superiors of many orders and religious congregations, and representatives of various Catholic groups. One-third of the world's bishops (an unprecedented number) petitioned for the canonization of Escrivá. (Messori 1997)

During the days of the canonization event, Church officials commented on the universal reach and validity of the message of the founder, echoing John Paul II's decree Christifideles Omnes on Escrivá's virtues which said that "by inviting Christians to be united to God through their daily work, which is something men will have to do and find their dignity in as long as the world lasts, the timeliness of this message is destined to endure as an inexhaustible source of spiritual light, regardless of changing epochs and situations."

== Criticism of the process of canonization ==
Opus Dei critics take issue with what they see as Escrivá's lightning canonization. They argue that the whole process was plagued by irregularities. Kenneth L. Woodward, the longtime religion editor and senior writer for the American newsmagazine Newsweek, says that the 'Devil's advocate' system was bypassed and witnesses hostile to Escrivá were not called. According to him, it is not true that eleven critics of Escrivá's canonization were heard. He says there was only one. He says the "consultors" were mainly Italian and members of Opus Dei: this stopped Escrivá's many critical Spanish peers from upsetting the procedure, but it also broke the convention that "consultors" should be the fellow countrymen of the proposed saint. He also states that Opus Dei argued that Escrivá was too "international" to need this.

Several people complained publicly that they were prevented from testifying before the church tribunals tasked with investigating Escrivá's life. Among those who have claimed that they were refused a hearing because of their critical views regarding Escrivá were Miguel Fisac (a well-known Spanish architect who was one of the earliest members of Opus Dei and remained an associate of Escrivá for nearly twenty years), Monsignor Vladimir Felzmann (a Czech-born engineer and Catholic priest from the UK, who was Escrivá's personal assistant), María del Carmen Tapia (who worked with Escrivá in Opus Dei's central offices in Rome and directed its printing press), Carlos Albás (a Spanish lawyer who was also Escrivá's first cousin once removed), María Angustias Moreno (who was an official of the women's part of Opus Dei during Escrivá's lifetime), and Dr. John Roche (an Irish physicist and historian of science who was a member of Opus Dei from 1959 to 1973 and who managed one of its schools in Kenya).

Opus Dei officials have claimed that Escrivá's cause had been unanimously approved. However, Newsweek stated that two of the judges, Luigi De Magistris, deputy head of the Vatican's Apostolic Penitentiary, and Justo Fernández Alonso, rector of the Spanish National Church in Rome, did not approve the cause. In fact, one of the dissenters wrote that beatifying Escrivá could cause the church "grave public scandal." The journal Il Regno, published in Bologna by the congregation of the Priests of the Sacred Heart (the Dehonians), reproduced, in May 1992, the confidential vote of one of the judges in Escrivá's cause of beatification, in which the judge asks that the process be suspended and raises questions about the undue haste of the proceedings, the near absence of testimony from critics in the documentation gathered by the postulators, the failure of the documentation to properly address issues about Escrivá's relations with Francoist Spain and with other Catholic organizations, and suggestions from the official testimonies themselves that Escrivá lacked proper spiritual humility.

This document does not identify the judge by name, but he indicates that he met Escrivá only once, briefly, in 1966, while serving as a notary for the Holy Office, which implies that the judge in question was De Magistris. In his vote (which its own contents date to August 1989), De Magistris also argues that the testimony from the main witness, Msgr. Álvaro del Portillo, who was Escrivá's confessor for 31 years, should have been excluded from the proceedings. John Allen Jr. comments that, according to some observers, De Magistris suffered as a result of his opposition to Escrivá's beatification. De Magistris became head of the Apostolic Penitentiary in 2001, an important position in the Vatican bureaucracy which normally is followed by elevation to the cardinalate, but he retired less than two years later and was made a cardinal only in 2015 by Pope Francis.

According to Kenneth Woodward, author of Making Saints: How the Catholic Church Determines Who Becomes a Saint, Who Doesn't, and Why, Opus Dei members put hundreds of bishops under financial pressure in order to have them send positive reports about Escrivá to the Vatican. Especially in the Third World, bishops were allegedly told that financial contributions from Opus Dei might be in jeopardy if they did not answer the request for positive testimony. According to Woodward, 40% of the testimony came from just two men, (Alvaro) Portillo (deceased Opus Dei prelate and Escrivá's successor) and his assistant Father Javier Echevarria, (current Opus Dei prelate).

On the other hand, supporters refer to Fr. Rafael Perez, an Augustinian, "one of the best experts" on canonization and who was the judge of Escrivá's Madrid Tribunal. He says that the process was fast because first, Escrivá's figure is "of the universal importance;" second, the Postulators "knew what they were doing;" third, in 1983 the procedures were simplified in order to present "models who lived in a world like ours."

Fr. Flavio Capucci, the Postulator, also reported that the 6000 postulatory letters to the Vatican showed "earnestness." His team submitted 16 volumes on Escrivá's life including the published criticisms against him. The Tribunals listened to 92 witnesses, most of whom were non-members, much above the minimum. Among them were 11 ex-members. Of the 92, 66 were Spaniards who went to the Madrid court. Each one was asked 252 questions on Escrivá's life, 10 of which were based on the criticisms. Together with the investigative material, the 980 court sessions make this "the longest process to date." Perez also noted that the Tribunal's work is very rigorous and it "listens only to people who are credible" and not to those who "just want to cause harm." He also said that "money can never make a saint," but "genuine interest." Opus Dei supporters say that the other accusations including a slur against the bishops of the Catholic Church are baseless allegations which anyone can think up. Supporters also say that the attacks against the founder's beatification in 1992 have turned into acceptance and support by the time of the canonization in 2002. (Documentation Service Vol V, 3, March 1992)

Escrivá's canonization was one of the first to be processed after the 1983 Code of Canon Law streamlined the procedures for canonization, and so it moved more quickly than was typical before. Even under the old procedures, the canonization of St. Thérèse of Lisieux took twenty-seven years, roughly the same as Escrivá's, while Mother Teresa, under the new procedures, was canonized nineteen years after her death.

According to John Allen, Jr., Mother Teresa's process was quick not "simply because her postulator did a good job. It was clear that John Paul II wanted it to happen. Similarly with Escriva, the pope's long track record of support and devotion...left no doubt where he wanted the process to end. That, in fact, is probably the single most telling argument against the hypothesis that Opus Dei 'bought' or 'manipulated' the beatification and canonization. There was no reason why they had to."

"The most defensible conclusion," says Allen, "seems to be that Opus Dei may have played hard and fast, but they played by the rules." (Opus Dei, p. 265)

Escrivá's books, including Furrow, The Way, Christ is Passing By, and The Forge, continue to be read widely both by members of Opus Dei and by other Catholics attracted to his spirituality, which emphasizes the laity's calling to daily sanctification (a message also to be found in the documents of Vatican II). Pope John Paul II made the following observation in his homily at the beatification of Escrivá:

"With supernatural intuition, Blessed Josemaría untiringly preached the universal call to holiness and apostolate. Christ calls everyone to become holy in the realities of everyday life. Hence work too is a means of personal holiness and apostolate, when it is done in union with Jesus Christ."

== See also ==
- List of Opus Dei saints and beatified people
