= Luigi de Magistris =

Luigi de Magistris may refer to:

- Luigi De Magistris (cardinal) (1926-2022), Italian Roman Catholic cardinal
- Luigi de Magistris (politician) (born 1967), Italian politician and magistrate
