= Roman College of the Holy Cross =

International College and Seminary in Rome

- Collegio Romano della Santa Croce (Italian); Colegio Romano de la Santa Cruz (Spanish)
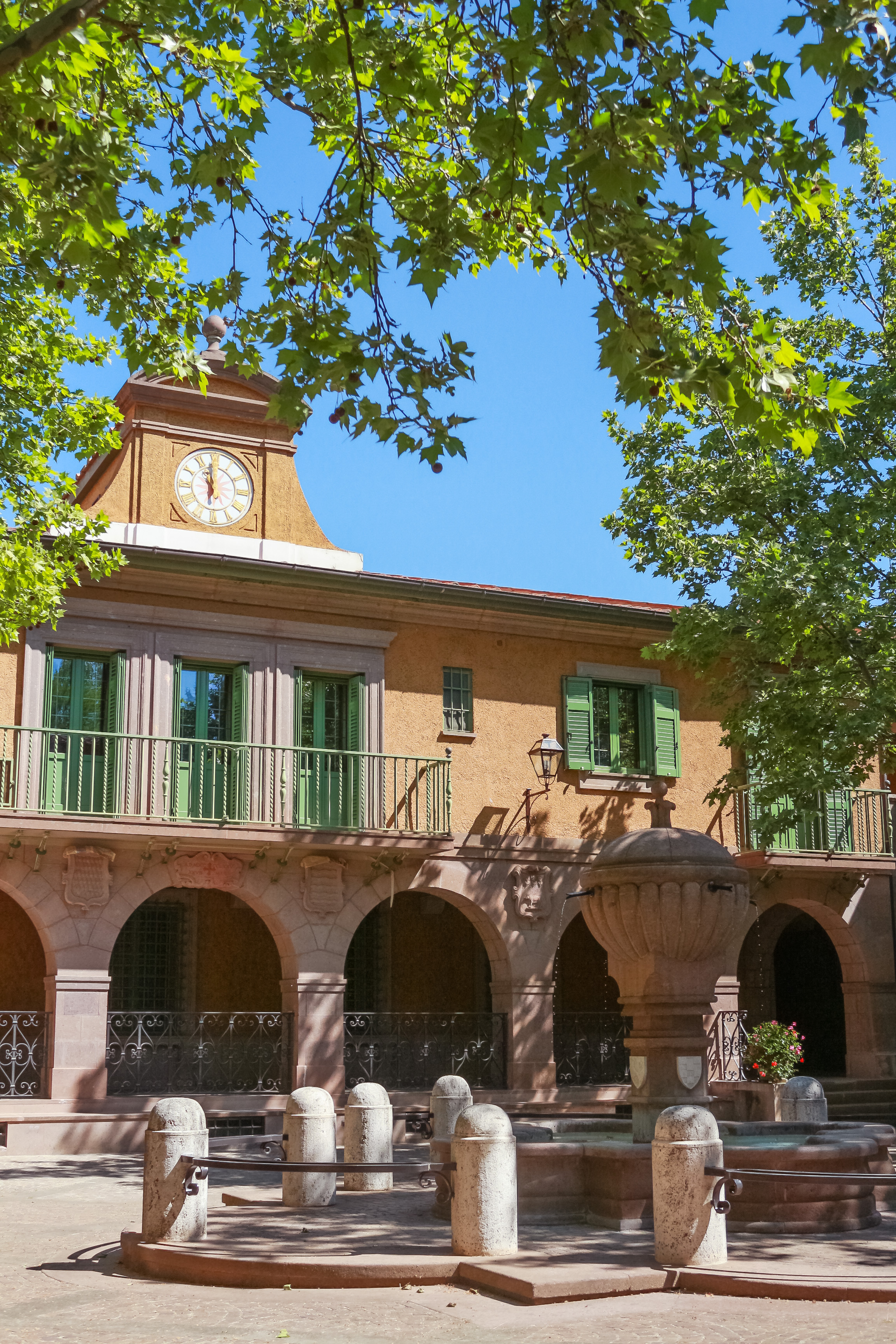
- Latin: Collegium Romanum Sanctæ Crucis
- Type: Private College, Seminary
- Established: 29 June 1948 (77 years ago)
- Founders: Josemaria Escrivá de Balaguer
- Affiliations: Catholic Church, Prelature of Opus Dei
- Rector: Fr. Fernando Crovetto
- Location: Via di Grottarossa, 1375, 00189; Rome, Italy; 41°58′25″N 12°29′25″E
- Website: https://opusdei.org/es-es/article/cavabianca-colegio-romano-de-la-santa-cruz-opus-dei/

The Roman College of the Holy Cross (Italian: Collegio Romano della Santa Croce; Spanish: Colegio Romano de la Santa Cruz; Latin: Colegium Romanum Sanctæ Crucis), also known as Centro Internazionale Cavabianca, is an international formation centre of Prelature of Opus Dei. Erected by Saint Josemaría Escrivá in Rome on 29 June 1948, the feast day of Saints Peter and Paul the Apostle. The college provides the doctrinal and spiritual formation to the male members of Opus Dei, including the numeraries and associates member of the Prelature.

The Roman College of the Holy Cross is also the international seminary of the Prelature, where the numeraries or associates of the Prelature receive priestly formation to becoming a priest incardinated to the Prelature.

The students at the Roman College of the Holy Cross conduct their studies in Theology, Philosophy, Canon Law, and Social Communications of the Church at the Pontifical University of the Holy Cross.

There is also another college for the women members of the Prelature: the Roman College of Santa Maria, presently located in Villa Ballestra.

== History ==
St. Josemaría Escrivá founded Opus Dei on October 2, 1928 in Madrid, and lived in Rome since 1946 until his death on June 26, 1975, from where he coordinated the expansion of Opus Dei to other countries. Seeing how his dreams of taking the charism of Opus Dei throughout the world were becoming a reality, Josemaría Escrivá felt the need, on the one hand, to properly prepare the members who would begin this apostolic work in a new country and, on the other, to adequately form the first vocations that were sprouting in each place.

With this idea in mind, he established the Roman College of the Holy Cross on June 29, 1948, as an international formation center for male numeraries of Opus Dei. Over the years, some associate members would also join the Roman College of the Holy Cross.

In its early days, the Roman College occupied part of the headquarters of Opus Dei in Villa Tevere, which was under construction from 1949 to 1960. But St. Josemaría soon began to look for possible locations to give the Roman College more autonomy, with larger facilities that would allow for a healthy formation for a large group of young people. In fact, to give an idea of the dimensions of the project, if the first class of students at the Roman College was made up of only six students, by 1953 – five years after the erection of the Roman College – the number of students had far exceeded one hundred.

St. Josemaría considered various options within the city of Rome. For example, the Oratorio del Gonfalone in Via Giulia, today the headquarters of the Roman Polyphonic Choir, or the Catacomb of St. Valentine, which is very close to Villa Tevere, the central headquarters of Opus Dei. But as these and other efforts did not come to fruition, the headquarters of the Roman College remained in Villa Tevere until 1974, when it was finally moved to Cavabianca, the name given by St. Josemaría to a large complex of new buildings built in the area of Saxa Rubra, on the outskirts and at the northern end of the city of Rome. Cavabianca was under construction from 1971 to 1974.

== Currently ==
In addition to being an international college, the Roman College of the Holy Cross is also the international seminary of the Prelature of Opus Dei. Many of its students, after completing the necessary philosophical and theological studies and an appropriate and free vocational discernment, both on the part of the candidate and the training staff of the Roman College, also receive a specific preparation for the priesthood. Opus Dei has a “Ratio institutionis sacerdotalis”, approved by the Holy See, which is a document that regulates the formation of the priests of the Prelature.

== Bibliography ==
- Andreas Vazquez de Prada, Founder of Opus Dei, Volume III. Scepter Publishers, 2005.

== See also ==
- Personal Prelatrue
- Opus Dei
