= Women in Opus Dei =

Women form 57% of the membership of the Opus Dei prelature. The role of women in Opus Dei has sometimes been a source of criticism for the organization.

== Roles of women in the organization ==
=== Separate branches ===
Founder Josemaría Escrivá's initial vision for Opus Dei in 1928 was firmly a male-only organization, but he decided in 1930 that God had directed him to create a women's branch as well. Opus Dei continues to have two branches, one for men and one for women, and they operate nearly independently of each other. The General Council of the men's branch and the Central Advisory Council of the women's branch both advise the prelate, and the councils generally communicate with each other only in writing. When choosing a new prelate, female delegates propose the candidates, male delegates vote on the candidates, and the Pope confirms the elected candidate.

=== Segregation of numerary members and residential centers ===
Male and female numeraries are celibate and segregated by sex, with very limited contact—male and female numeraries live in separate centers and attend separate classes and retreats. Some non-members also live in segregated Opus Dei residential centers, such as students at local universities.

=== Domestic work of assistant numerary members ===
Female assistant numeraries perform cooking, cleaning, sewing, and other household duties in centers of Opus Dei as their professional work. Numerary assistants clean both men's and women's centers; while women clean for men, men never clean for the women.

A number of former assistant numeraries have accused Opus Dei of exploiting them, for example, recruiting them from poor families while young, even as minors, working them for 12 hours a day, with few days off, not paying them fairly, and not providing financial support to those who leave. A French woman who attended an affiliated hospitality school and began working as an assistant numerary as a teenager took Opus Dei and the school to court for abusive labor practices, with a trial in 2011. The Paris Criminal Court fined the school and two of its employees in 2013 after an appeal. In 2021, a group of 43 former assistant numeraries from Argentina and other countries in South America made a joint complaint to Opus Dei and the Vatican relating to similar matters. In early 2024, three Irish former assistant numeraries made similar accusations in the media, with 13 other assistant numeraries from the US, Europe and Africa also interviewed by the Financial Times.

== Universities and schools ==
Opus Dei operates and supports schools and universities around the world. Schools are single-sex, and men teach at schools for boys while women teach at schools for girls. A former student said that male-only Opus Dei clubs at the University of Navarra in the 1990s led to additional opportunities and preferential treatment for boys.

== Teachings and positions ==
=== Organizational position ===
Supporters say that although men and women are treated differently, men and women are regarded as equals. A spokesman has said that Opus Dei is committed to the "equal dignity of men and women." In the opinion of one member, women should not enter the workforce as "one more" but as a "different one," given that "the only ontological difference among human beings is determined by the sexes," and that care for the family and the home are "eminently feminine." Supporters say that Opus Dei, with its emphasis on work, is a strong advocate of women becoming professionals—according to one scholar, "Opus Dei has an enviable record of educating the poor and supporting women, whether single or married, in any occupation they choose."

In the context of Opus Dei's approach in Central America in the 1990s, a survey of Central American non-governmental organizations found that 80% said "it did not represent the needs or aspirations of women in their countries" and 51% said that "it kept women in a subordinate position".

In an academic book about patriarchy, Diane Dougherty wrote that Opus Dei's teachings promote gender discrimination, and that conservative members of Opus Dei in political office have used their positions to limit the rights of women.

=== Founder Josemaría Escrivá ===
Critics object to some of founder Josemaría Escrivá's teachings on women. He once wrote, "Wives, you should ask yourself whether you are not forgetting a little about your appearance. Your duty is, and will always be, to take as good care of your appearance as you did before you were married—and it is a duty of justice." Escriva similarly stated that "Women needn't be scholars—it's enough for them to be prudent."

A former member, Isabel de Armas, wrote in her book Ser mujer en el Opus Dei [Being a Woman in Opus Dei] that Escriva was misogynist, and that the organization marginalized women members.

=== Relationship with Catholic teachings ===
Many of these criticisms are directed not just at Opus Dei, but at Catholicism as a whole. As in the rest of the Catholic Church, women may not join the priesthood or participate in the very highest levels of church governance. The Catholic prohibitions against abortion and birth control have also drawn criticism. While a minority of Roman Catholics have advocated for changing these stances, Opus Dei is generally seen as supportive of them.

Many critics of such policies have therefore opposed Opus Dei, as in the case of one author who views Opus Dei "as one of the most reactionary organizations in the Roman Catholic Church today...for its devotion to promoting, as public policy, the Vatican's inflexibly traditionalist approach to women, and reproductive health." Those who approve of the Vatican's policies, meanwhile, applaud Opus Dei's stance on those issues.
