= Peter Berglar =

German historian

Peter Berglar (February 8, 1919 – November 10, 1989) was a German historian, professor of Modern and Contemporary History at the University of Cologne, and was known for his many publications. His biography of Thomas More is considered one of the best.

== Early life and education ==
Berglar was born in Kassel in 1919 and grew up in Darmstadt. He studied human medicine in Berlin and received his MD in 1944. He practised medicine until 1966, specializing in internal medicine in Cologne.

At the University of Cologne, he studied history, German philology, and Iberian and Latin-American history. He finished his doctoral studies in 1969 and his doctoral thesis was published. In 1970, he was appointed Professor of Medieval and Modern History at the University of Cologne.

== Publications ==
Berglar wrote numerous literary works, essays, articles for scientific journals and newspapers, along with appearances on the radio. The following can be highlighted:

- Schiller oder der heroische Irrtum (Schiller or the Heroic Fallacy). Bonn 1959
- Welt und Wirkung. Gedanken über Menschen, Christen, Deutsche. (World and Effect). Bibliotheca Christiana, Bonn 1961, ISBN B0000BGDZP
- Verhängnis und Verheißung. Papst Hadrian VI. - Der "Jesuitenstaat" in Paraguay. (Doom and Promise). Bibliotheca Christiana, Bonn 1963
- Die Gesellschaftliche Evolution der Menschheit (The Social Evolution of Humanity). Bibliotheca Christiana, Bonn 1965, ISBN B0000BGDZI
- Personen und Stationen -- Deutschlands, Europas, der Welt zwischen 1789 und heute (Persons and Milestones: of Germany, of Europe, and of the World from 1789 to the present). Bibliotheca Christiana, Bonn 1966, ISBN B0000BQ1FM
- Fortschritt zum Ursprung. Die Geschichtsneurose des modernen Menschen. Otto Müller, Salzburg 1978, ISBN 3-7013-0571-4
- "Geschichte als Tradition - Geschichte als Fortschritt," in: Archiv für hessische Geschichte und Altertumskunde 1989, vol 47, p. 401–402

He also wrote the following biographies:

- Annette von Droste-Hülshoff. Reinbeck 1967, ISBN B0000BQ1FI
- Wilhelm von Humboldt. Rowohlt-Verlag, Reinbeck 1970, ISBN 3-499-50161-9
- Matthias Claudius. Rowohlt-Verlag, Reinbeck 1972; 2003 ISBN 3-499-50192-9
- Metternich -- Metternich. Kutscher Europas, Arzt der Revolutionen. Göttingen 1973, ISBN 3-7881-0079-6
- Konrad Adenauer -- Konrad Adenauer: Konkursverwalter oder Erneuerer der Nation? Göttingen 1975, ISBN 3-7881-0087-7
- Thomas More -- Die Stunde des Thomas Morus – Einer gegen die Macht. Freiburg 1978; Adamas-Verlag, Köln 1998, ISBN 3-925746-78-1
- Maria Theresa -- Maria Theresia. Rowohlt-Verlag, Reinbeck 1980; 2004 ISBN 3-499-50286-0
- Walther Rathenau -- Walther Rathenau. Ein Leben zwischen Philosophie und Politik. Styria-Verlag, Graz 1987 ISBN 3-222-11667-9
- Josemaría Escrivá -- Opus Dei. Leben und Werk des Gründers, Josemaria Escrivá. Adamas-Verlag, Köln 2005, ISBN 3-925746-67-6 (Opus Dei: Life and works of the founder, Josemaria Escriva)
- Saint Peter -- Petrus. Adamas-Verlag, Köln 1999, ISBN 3-925746-79-X
