= Andrés Vázquez (baseball) =

Professional baseball player

- Outfielder
- Batted: Left Threw: Left

Negro league baseball debut
- 1935, for the Cuban Stars (East)

Last appearance
- 1935, for the Cuban Stars (East)

Teams
- Cuban Stars (East) (1935)

Andrés Vázquez is a former Negro league outfielder who played in the 1930s.

Vázquez played for the Cuban Stars (East) in 1935. In ten recorded games, he posted 19 hits with a home run in 50 plate appearances.
