= Kenneth L. Woodward =

American religion writer

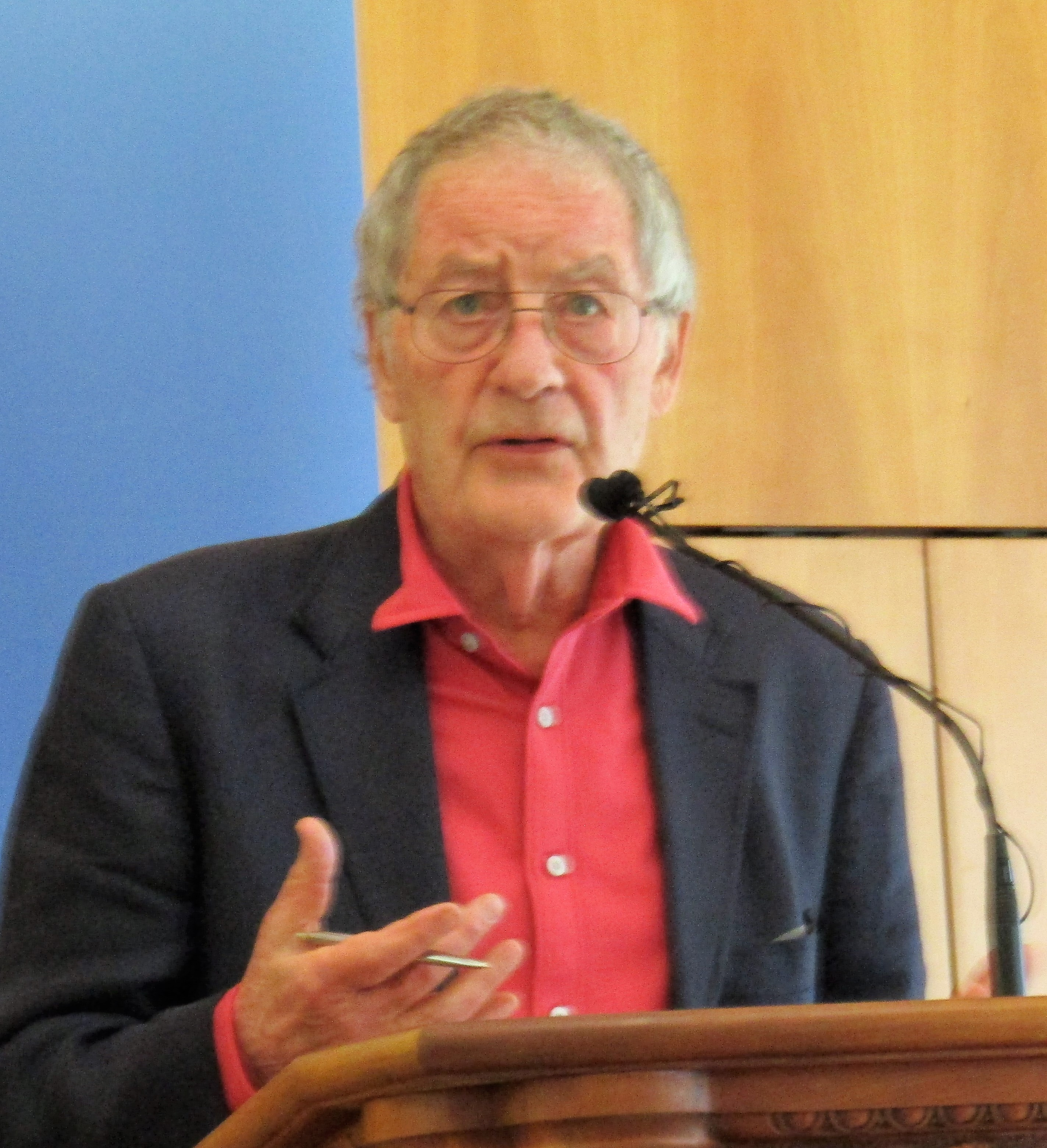
- Born: October 5, 1935; Detroit
- Political party: Democratic Party

Kenneth L. Woodward (born October 5, 1935) is an American Roman Catholic writer. He was editor of the Religion section of national American magazine Newsweek from 1964 until his retirement in 2002.

== Biography ==
Woodward was born in Detroit, Michigan, to Roy and Marie Woodward. He graduated from Saint Ignatius High School in Cleveland, Ohio, then studied literature at University of Notre Dame in Notre Dame, IN (1957 BA). He also studied at the University of Michigan Law School, the University of Iowa in Iowa City, and the University of Strasbourg in Alsace.

Woodward married Elizabeth 'Betty' Drey on September 6, 1959, and the couple had two boys and one daughter.

Woodward was hired as a journalist by the Omaha Sun newspaper in 1962. In 1964, he was named Religion Editor for Newsweek and remained in that position until 2002. He also served as the Ideas section editor from 1974 through 1978, and was named Senior Writer in 1988. After his retirement as Religion editor, he continued as a contributing writer to Newsweek, and as Regent's Lecturer at University of California, Santa Barbara He is the Writer-in-residence at the Lumen Christi Institute of the University of Chicago.

== Views ==
Woodward has described John Paul II's Theology of the Body as "a highly romantic and unrealistic view of human sexuality."

Woodward claimed that the ‘Devil’s advocate’ system was bypassed and hostile witnesses were not called during the Canonization of Josemaría Escrivá. According to Woodward, it is not true that eleven critics of Escrivá's canonization were heard. He says there was only one. He says the "consultors" were mainly Italian and members of Opus Dei: this stopped Escrivá's many critical Spanish peers from upsetting the procedure, but it also broke the convention that "consultors" should be fellow countrymen of the proposed saint. He also said that Opus Dei's position was that Escrivá was too "international" to need this.

== Bibliography ==
- Grandparents/Grandchildren: The Vital Connection (with Arthur Kornhaber), Doubleday (New York, NY), 1981.
- Making Saints: How the Catholic Church Determines Who Becomes a Saint, Who Doesn't, and Why, Simon & Schuster (New York, NY), 1990.
- The Book of Miracles: The Meaning of the Miracle Stories in Christianity, Judaism, Buddhism, Hinduism, Islam, Simon & Schuster (New York, NY), 2000.

Woodward has written over a hundred Newsweek cover stories. He has contributed to such periodicals as America, Commonweal, The Nation, Smithsonian, Psychology Today, The New York Times, The Washington Post, Chicago Tribune, The Wall Street Journal, First Things, Concilium, and The Christian Century.
