= Andrés Vázquez de Prada =

Spanish historian and diplomat

Andres Vazquez de Prada y Vallejo
- Born: 19 December 1924; Valladolid, Spain
- Died: 27 August 2005 (aged 80); Madrid, Spain
- Occupations: diplomat, writer

Andres Vazquez de Prada y Vallejo (19 December 1924 in Valladolid – 27 August 2005 in Madrid) was a Spanish historian, lawyer, professor, diplomat and writer.

== Life ==
He studied law in Valladolid and Seville, where he was later professor of Governmental Law. In 1947, his doctoral thesis, General Theory of De Facto Governments, obtained the prize for outstanding work at the University of Madrid.

Later he focussed his professional efforts in the field of diplomacy and moved to London, where he worked in the Spanish embassy as embassy attaché while also carrying out a notable literary work. He has published several studies on important figures in the English Catholic Church, including The dream of an old man (1954) on John Henry Newman.

He played an active role in the start and growth of Opus Dei's apostolic work in the United Kingdom. He met Josemaria Escriva de Balaguer in the first Center of Opus Dei in Valladolid. On 28 September 1942 he requested admission as a Numerary. From 1977 on he devoted himself full-time to researching the life of St. Josemaria Escriva de Balaguer which resulted in his three-volume biography of the founder of Opus Dei. In the 1990s, during the writing of this biography, he lived in Rome. After completing the work, he returned to Spain. After a long sickness he died in Madrid on 27 August 2005.

== Selected list of works ==
- Cardinal Newman (1954)
- Thomas More (1966)
- El scented del humor (The Meaning of Humor) (1976)
- The Founder of Opus Dei, Volume I: The Early Years, Princeton (N.J.), Scepter Publishers, 2001
- The Founder of Opus Dei, Volume II - God and Daring, New York, 2003
- The Founder of Opus Dei, Volume III: The Divine Ways on Earth, New York, 2005
