= Luigi De Magistris (cardinal) =

Catholic archbishop (1926–2022)

His Eminence Luigi De Magistris
- Cardinal, Pro-Major Penitentiary Emeritus
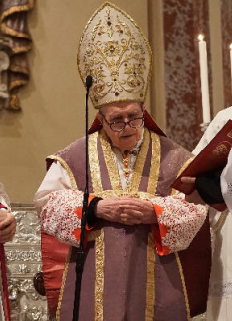
- Cardinal De Magistris in 2015
- Appointed: 22 November 2001
- Term ended: 4 October 2003
- Predecessor: William Wakefield Baum
- Successor: James Francis Stafford
- Other post: Cardinal-Deacon of Santissimo Nome di Gesu e Maria in Via Lata
- Previous posts: Regent of Apostolic Penitentiary (1979–2001); Titular Archbishop of Nova (1996–2001); Pro-Major Penitentiary (2001–2003)

Orders
- Ordination: 12 April 1952
- Consecration: 28 April 1996 by Giovanni Canestri
- Created cardinal: 14 February 2015 by Pope Francis

Personal details
- Born: 23 February 1926 Cagliari, Italy
- Died: 16 February 2022 (aged 95) Cagliari, Italy
- Denomination: Roman Catholic
- Education: University of Cagliari; Pontifical Lateran University
- Motto: Iuste Iudica Proximo (Judge thy neighbor justly)
- Coat of arms: Luigi De Magistris's coat of arms

Styles of Luigi De Magistris
- Reference style: His Eminence
- Spoken style: Your Eminence
- Informal style: Cardinal

Ordination history of Luigi De Magistris
History
Priestly ordination
- Date: 12 April 1952
Episcopal consecration
- Principal consecrator: Giovanni Canestri
- Co-consecrators: Ottorino Pietro Alberti; Tarcisio Pillolla
- Date: 28 April 1996
Cardinalate
- Elevated by: Pope Francis
- Date: 14 February 2015

Luigi De Magistris (23 February 1926 – 16 February 2022) was an Italian prelate of the Catholic Church who served as Pro-Major Penitentiary of the Apostolic Penitentiary from 2001 to 2003 after working for more than forty years in the Roman Curia, more than twenty of them in the Apostolic Penitentiary. He was made a bishop in 1996, an archbishop in 2001, and a cardinal in 2015.

== Biography ==
Luigi de Magistris nobile dei conti of Castella and Belvedere, was born on 23 February 1926 in Cagliari, Sardinia, Italy, in an aristocratic piedmontese family as the youngest of eight children of the renowned physician Don Edmondo de Magistris, Count of Castella and Belvedere, and Donna Agnese Ballero. He earned a degree from the University of Cagliari before entering the Pontifical Roman Seminary. He was ordained a priest of the Archdiocese of Cagliari on 12 April 1952. He spent the next five years in Cagliari as a parish priest while serving on the ecclesiastical tribunal of the Archdiocese. He then studied at the Pontifical Lateran University.

His career in the Roman Curia began on 1 October 1958 when he became secretary of the Lateran Athenaeum. From February 1959 to February 1969 he worked in the Congregation for the Doctrine of the Faith; he served on the staff of Cardinal Alfredo Ottaviani, the head of that Congregation, during the Second Vatican Council. He spent the next ten years with the Council of Public Affairs of the Church.

He was appointed regent of the Apostolic Penitentiary, its second-highest office, in April 1979. He was appointed Titular Bishop of Nova on 6 March 1996 by Pope John Paul II and consecrated as a bishop on 28 April 1996 by Cardinal Giovanni Canestri.

On 22 November 2001, when Cardinal William Wakefield Baum retired as Major Penitentiary, De Magistris was appointed Pro-Major Penitentiary, a title then used for a non-cardinal holding the position of Major Penitentiary, and raised to the rank of archbishop of the same titular see. On 2 May 2002, he was made a member of the Congregation for Divine Worship and the Discipline of the Sacraments. On 22 May 2003 he was named a member of the Pontifical Commission Ecclesia Dei.

In the 1980s he had raised objections to the proposed beatification of Josemaría Escrivá, the founder of Opus Dei, and he publicly opposed the canonization when it occurred in 2002, which may explain why he was replaced so quickly at the Penitentiary. The omission of De Magistris when Pope John Paul II announced the names of 33 new cardinals on 28 September 2003 "caused surprise". Instead Pope John Paul II sent him into retirement on 4 October, naming Cardinal James Stafford the new Major Penitentiary.

=== Cardinal ===
On 4 January 2015, Pope Francis announced that he would make De Magistris a cardinal on 14 February. De Magistris was surprised and heard the news while hearing confessions in the Cathedral of Cagliari. At the consistory, he was appointed Cardinal-Deacon of the titular church of Santissimi Nomi di Gesù e Maria in Via Lata.

In retirement, he worked in the Roman parishes of San Francesco a Ripa and San Salvatore in Lauro until 2010, when he moved to Cagliari for health reasons.

De Magistris died in Cagliari on 16 February 2022, aged 95.

== See also ==
- Cardinals created by Pope Francis

Catholic Church titles
Preceded by Giovanni Sessolo	Regent of the Apostolic Penitentiary; 2 May 1979 – 22 November 2001	Succeeded by Gianfranco Girotti
Preceded by Mario del Valle Moronta Rodríguez	— TITULAR — Titular Bishop of Nova; 6 March 1996 – 22 November 2001	Himself as Titular Archbishop
Himself as Titular Bishop	— TITULAR — Titular Archbishop of Nova; 22 November 2001 – 14 February 2015	Succeeded by Juan Carlos Cárdenas Toro
Preceded by William Wakefield Baum	Pro-Major Penitentiary of the Apostolic Penitentiary; 22 November 2001 – 4 October 2003	Succeeded by James Stafford
Preceded by Domenico Bartolucci	Cardinal-Deacon of Santissimi Nomi di Gesù e Maria in Via Lata; 14 February 2015 – 16 February 2022	Succeeded by Timothy Radcliffe
