= Vittorio Messori =

Italian journalist and Catholic writer (1941–2026)

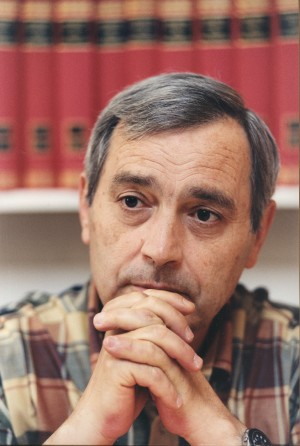
- Messori in 2004
- Born: 16 April 1941; Sassuolo, Italy
- Died: 3 April 2026 (aged 84); Desenzano del Garda, Italy
- Education: Liceo Classico Massimo d'Azeglio at Turin
- Alma mater: University of Turin
- Occupations: Writer; Reporter; Journalist
- Spouse: Rosanna Brichetti (m. 1996; died 2022)

Signature
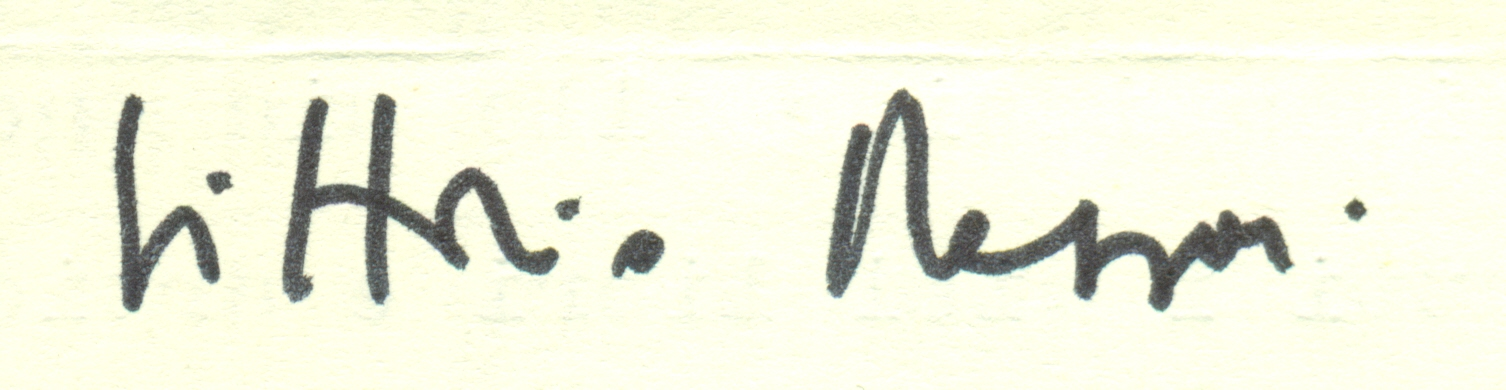

Vittorio Messori (16 April 1941 – 3 April 2026) was an Italian journalist and Catholic writer.

== Biography ==
Messori was born on April 16, 1941, in Sassuolo, in the province of Modena, into an anticlerical family. His father, Enzo, a poet in the Modena dialect, after three years in the Royal Italian Army, joined the Littorio Division of the Italian Social Republic and, following a period of training in Germany, fought on the Western Alps front against the French Army. Meanwhile, the family had taken refuge in the Brescia area, from where, after the end of World War II, they moved to Turin, settling in Borgo San Donato, in a building at number 18 Via Sobrero. Here his father found work at the general management of Italgas.

Messori attended public schools in Turin. After graduating from the Liceo Classico Massimo d'Azeglio, he enrolled in the Faculty of Political Science at the University of Turin, where he acquired a rationalist and agnostic education. He graduated in 1965 with a thesis on the history of the Risorgimento (supervisor: Alessandro Galante Garrone) and with two other complementary works defended with Luigi Firpo and Norberto Bobbio.

But a year before graduating in July 1964, while reading the Gospel, Messori converted to Catholic Christianity. As he himself said, "I was converted by an unexpected and irresistible force". In that experience which he defined as an "evidence of the heart". Conversion to Christianity was fulcrum of his life. Messori, after his Christian conversion, became a passionate researcher into the reasons for faith.

Messori died in his house in Desenzano del Garda on 3 April 2026, at the age of 84.

=== Private life ===
After having a previous marriage declared null by the Roman Catholic Church, in 1996 he was able to marry Rosanna Brichetti, whom he had met thirty years earlier within a community of faith and love. The couple had no children.

== Works ==
- The Ratzinger Report: An Exclusive Interview on the State of the Church (1985)
