= John L. Allen Jr. =

American Roman Catholic journalist (1965–2026)

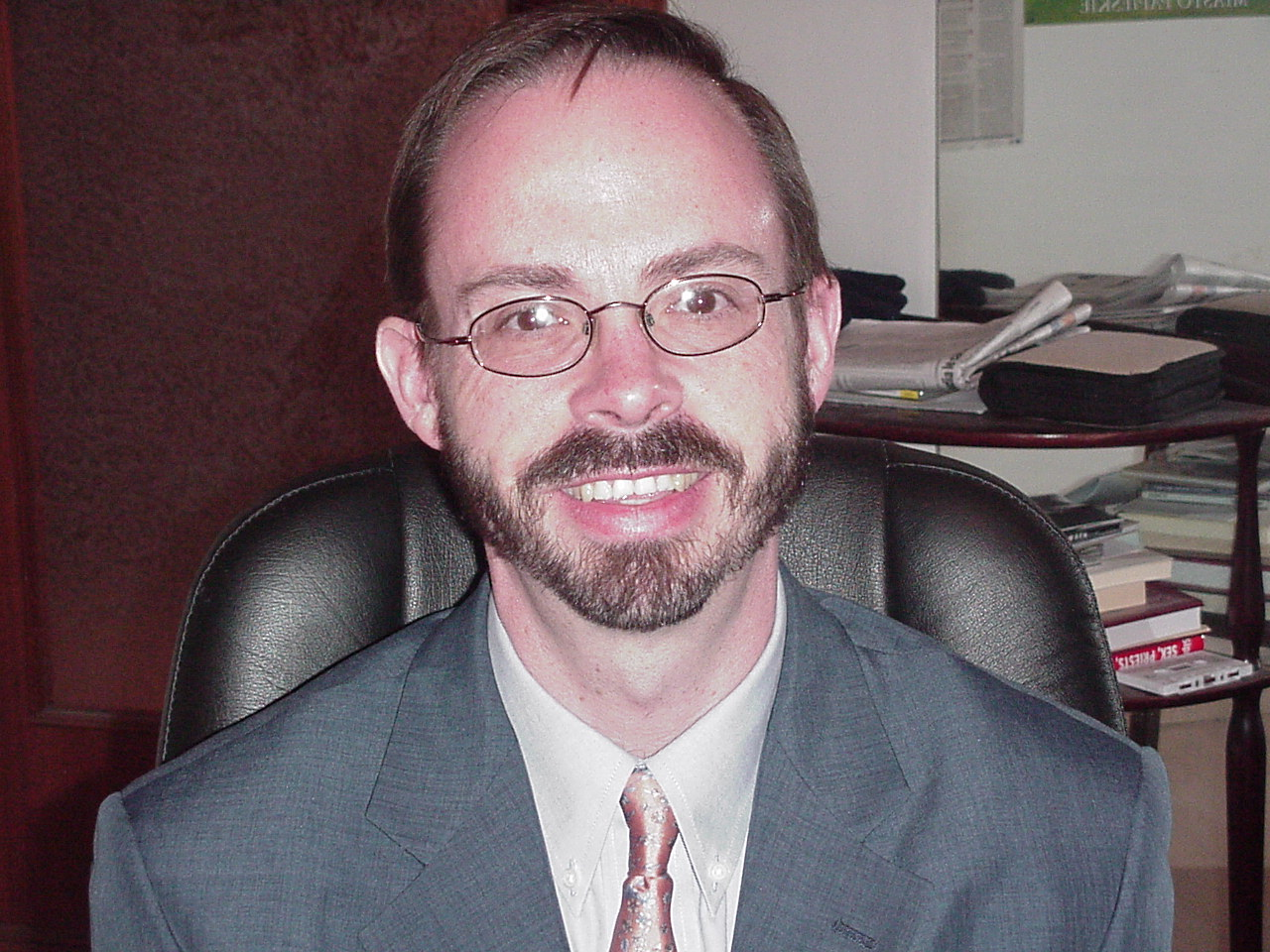
- Allen in 2005
- Born: January 20, 1965; Hays, Kansas, U.S.
- Died: January 22, 2026 (aged 61); Rome, Italy
- Education: Fort Hays State University; University of Kansas
- Occupations: Religion journalist and author
- Years active: 1997–2026
- Employer: Crux
- Spouse: Elise

John Lewis Allen Jr. (January 20, 1965 – January 22, 2026) was an American journalist and author who served as editor of the Catholic news website Crux, formerly hosted by The Boston Globe and now independently funded.

Before moving to The Boston Globe when Crux was established in 2014, Allen worked for 17 years in Rome as a Vatican watcher, covering the Holy See and the Pope for the National Catholic Reporter. He also served as a Senior Vatican Analyst for CNN, and featured in broadcast coverage of the conclaves of 2005 and 2013. Allen was the St. Francis de Sales Fellow of Communication and Media at the Word on Fire Institute founded by Bishop Robert Barron. Allen was the author of numerous books about the Catholic Church. He wrote two biographies of Pope Benedict XVI.

== Early life and education ==
John Lewis Allen Jr. was born on January 20, 1965, in Hays, Kansas. He graduated from Capuchin-founded Thomas More Prep-Marian High School in 1983. He received a bachelor's degree in philosophy from Fort Hays State University and a master's degree in religious studies from the University of Kansas. From 1993 until 1997, Allen taught journalism and oversaw the student-run newspaper, The Knight, at Notre Dame High School in Sherman Oaks, California.

== Career ==
During the coverage of the death of Pope John Paul II, Allen frequently appeared on CNN. He then became the Senior Vatican Analyst for CNN. He also delivered lectures discussing Vatican issues and his latest works.

In 2014, Allen took up a position as associate editor with The Boston Globe and helped to launch its website, Crux. In 2016, the Globe transferred ownership of the Crux website and its intellectual property to Allen. It now operates on the basis of advertising income, syndication and licensing as well as support from benefactors. Allen and his wife, Elise, who also serves as a Senior Correspondent for Crux, lived in Rome.

In an interview quoted in the Vatican's 2020 McCarrick Report, Allen stated he did not report rumours because, "If I tried to interview every one of these guys [bishops] every time I heard something salacious, that is all I'd be doing and I'd be out of business in a heartbeat."

Allen received a number of honorary doctorates from universities:

- 2011: Doctor of Sacred Letters, St. Michael's College
- 2015: Doctor of Humanities, Lewis University (Romeoville, IL)
- 2015: Doctor of Humane Letters, Saint Michael's College (Colchester, VT)
- 2016: Doctor of Humane Letters, University of Dallas

== Personal life and death ==
Allen firstly married Shannon Levitt.

Allen married fellow journalist Elise Ann Harris in Key West, Florida, in about 2020.

Allen suffered with stomach cancer for three years prior to his death in Rome, on January 22, 2026, at the age of 61.

== Publications ==
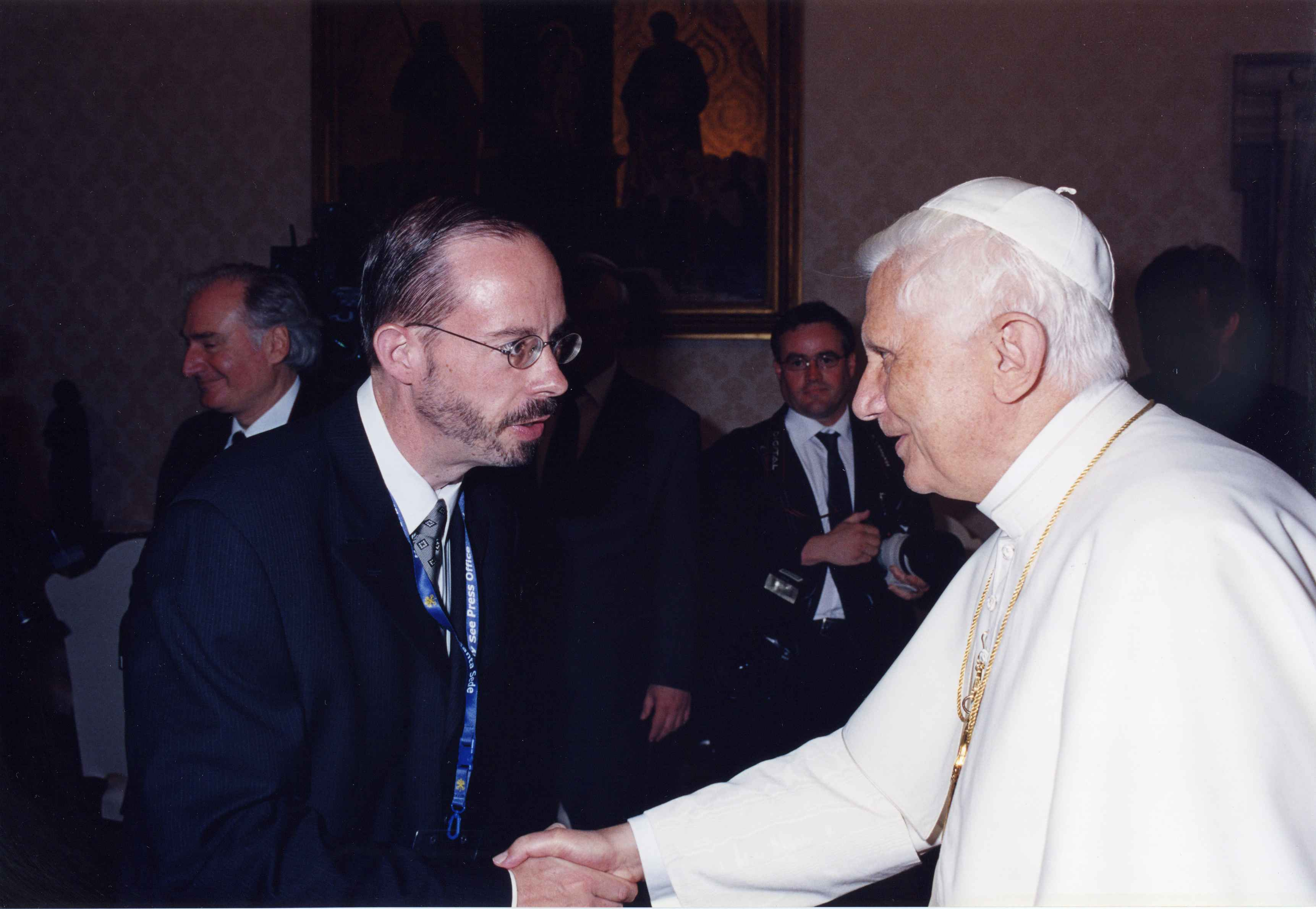
Allen with Pope Benedict XVI

In addition to a column and occasional other pieces for NCR, Allen's work as a journalist appeared in The New York Times, The Washington Post, The Wall Street Journal, CNN, NPR, The Tablet, Jesus, Second Opinion, The Nation, the Miami Herald, Die Furche, and the Irish Examiner.

Allen wrote, among other books, two biographies of Pope Benedict XVI. The first was written before then-Cardinal Joseph Ratzinger became pope, the other after his election to the papacy. In 2000, Allen published Cardinal Ratzinger: The Vatican's Enforcer of the Faith, the first biography of Ratzinger in English. Several reviewers criticized it as being biased against Ratzinger. Joseph Komonchak called it "Manichaean journalism". After some examination, Allen concluded that this criticism was valid. In his next biography of Ratzinger, The Rise of Benedict XVI: The Inside Story of How the Pope Was Elected and Where He Will Take the Catholic Church (2005), Allen tried to be fair to all sides and viewpoints. Allen acknowledged that his first book was "unbalanced" because it was his first book and was written, he wrote, "before I arrived in Rome and before I really knew a lot about the universal church". In that acknowledgement he said the first biography "gives prominent voice to criticisms of Ratzinger; it does not give equally prominent voice to how he himself would see some of these issues".

In 2005 he published a book about Opus Dei, Opus Dei: An Objective Look Behind the Myths and Reality of the Most Controversial Force in the Catholic Church. Allen said that one of his reasons for writing his study of Opus Dei was that he felt that liberal and conservative Catholics were too often shouting at each other, and he hoped that a book that tried to be fair to all sides would lead to civilized discussion. According to John Romanowsky of Godspy, Allen's ability to report objectively, without revealing his personal opinion, has been called "maddening".

Kenneth L. Woodward, former religion editor for Newsweek, wrote in 2005: "Outside of the North Korean government in Pyongyang, no bureaucracy is harder for a journalist to crack than the Vatican's. And no one does it better than John L. Allen Jr. ... In just three years, Allen has become the journalist other reporters—and not a few cardinals—look to for the inside story on how all the pope's men direct the world's largest church."

Allen was critical of how the Vatican communicated the decision to lift the excommunications of the bishops of the Society of Saint Pius X.

=== Books ===
- Cardinal Ratzinger: The Vatican's Enforcer of the Faith. New York, NY: Continuum, 2000.
  - Reprinted in 2005 as Pope Benedict XVI: A Biography of Joseph Ratzinger.
- Conclave: The Politics, Personalities, and Process of the Next Papal Election. New York, NY: Image Books, 2002.
- All the Pope's Men: The Inside Story of How the Vatican Really Thinks. New York, NY: Image Books, 2004.
- The Rise of Benedict XVI: The Inside Story of How the Pope Was Elected and Where He Will Take the Catholic Church. New York, NY: Image Books, 2006.
- Opus Dei: An Objective Look Behind the Myths and Reality of the Most Controversial Force in the Catholic Church. New York, NY: Image Books, 2007.
- The Future Church: How Ten Trends are Revolutionizing the Catholic Church. New York, NY: Image Books, 2009.
- The Catholic Church: What Everyone Needs to Know. Oxford: Oxford University Press, 2013.
- The Global War on Christians: Dispatches from the Front Lines of Anti-Christian Persecution. New York, NY: Image Books, 2013.
- The Francis Miracle: Inside the Transformation of the Pope and the Church. New York, NY: TIME Books, 2015.
- Shahbaz Bhatti: Martyr of the Suffering Church. Collegeville, MN: Liturgical Press, 2017.
- Catholics and Contempt: How Catholic Media Fuel Today's Fights, and What to Do About It. Park Ridge, IL: Word on Fire Institute, 2023.

=== Book-length conversations ===
- (with Cardinal Timothy Dolan) A People of Hope: The Challenges Facing the Catholic Church and the Faith that Can Save It. New York, NY: Image Books, 2011.
- (with Bishop Robert Barron) To Light a Fire on the Earth: Proclaiming the Gospel in a Secular Age. New York, NY: Image Books, 2017.

=== Booklets ===
- 10 Things Pope Benedict XVI Wants You to Know. Liguori, MO: Liguori Publications, 2007.
- Global Good News: Unseen Work of the Catholic Church. Liguori, MO: Liguori Publications, 2010.
- 10 Things Pope Francis Wants You to Know. Liguori, MO: Liguori Publications, 2013.
- Against the Tide: The Radical Leadership of Pope Francis. Liguori, MO: Liguori Publications, 2014.

=== Online articles/columns ===
- Crux articles – Archive of John Allen's articles on "Crux: Covering all things Catholic
- Boston Globe articles – Archive of John Allen's column in the Boston Globe
- All Things Catholic – Archive of John Allen's column in the National Catholic Reporter
