= Personal prelature =

Canonical institution of the Catholic Church

A personal prelature is an institution of the Catholic Church which comprises clergy, and optionally laity, under the jurisdiction of a prelate, which undertakes specific pastoral activities. Along with dioceses, and later military ordinariates, personal prelatures were originally under care of the Vatican's Congregation for Bishops, but since 4 August 2022, personal prelatures have been placed under care of the Dicastery for the Clergy. Unlike dioceses, which cover territories for the ordinary pastoral care of the faithful, personal prelatures minister to persons according to some specific pastoral goals, regardless of where they live. The first personal prelature is Opus Dei.

== Origins ==
In the Catholic Church, the personal prelature was conceived during the sessions of the Second Vatican Council in no. 10 of the decree Presbyterorum ordinis and was later enacted into law by Paul VI in his motu proprio Ecclesiae sanctae. The institution was later reaffirmed in the 1983 Code of Canon Law.

== Nature ==
A personal prelature is an institution having clergy, and optionally lay people, who carry out specific pastoral activities. The adjective personal refers to the fact that the pastoral activities are not linked to a territory but over persons wherever they happen to be. The establishment of personal prelatures is an exercise of the theologically inherent power of self-organization which the Church has to pursue its mission, though a personal prelature is not a particular church as dioceses and eparchies are.

== Structure ==
A personal prelature is a new and special institutional organization within the Catholic Church. The prelate is a presbyter nominated by the Pope and governs the prelature with ordinary power. In order to de-emphasize the importance of hierarchy in the governance of the personal prelature, Pope Francis decreed in 2022 that the prelate should not be a consecrated bishop.

The prelate has the right to erect a national or international seminary, and to promote students to holy orders, in service to the pastoral mission of the prelature (can. 295).

The faithful under care of a prelature is determined by personal criteria, which is established in each case by the Apostolic See, in the constitutional documents of the prelature, or in its statutes. Diverse organizational models are possible, according to a variety of possible missions. The statutes likewise determine the relations of the personal prelature with the diocesan bishops in whose dioceses the prelature exercises its pastoral or missionary works (can. 297).

== Application ==
=== Opus Dei ===
The first, and thus far the only, personal prelature is Opus Dei, which was established as a personal prelature by Pope John Paul II in 1982 through the Apostolic constitution Ut sit. In the case of Opus Dei, the prelate is elected by members of the prelature and confirmed by the Pope.

=== Other possible personal prelatures ===
Philippine clergy propose personal prelatures for the pastoral care of Filipino migrants. This canonical set-up can help the Filipino migrants integrate better into their local church and help spread best practices in integration from other places where Filipinos have migrated. A prelature rather than an ordinariate can better serve the purpose since it will not have to provide all the pastoral services and the migrants will continue to be faithful of their specific dioceses.

The Society of Saint Pius X has been offered a canonical restructuring as a personal prelature by Rome.

== See also ==
- Territorial prelate
