= List of Opus Dei saints and beatified people =

This list of Opus Dei saints and beatified people includes not only saints of the Catholic Church and those officially beatified by the Church (beati), but also those considered venerabili, servants of God or candidates for sainthood, who are faithful of the Prelature of Opus Dei.

In the year 1928, Fr. Josemaría Escrivá, a diocesan priest in Zaragoza, Spain, received the inspiration of establishing Opus Dei (English: Work of God), a way by which Catholics might learn to sanctify themselves in and through their secular work. After its foundation, numerous people from different walks of ordinary life and nationalities became members. The institution later received pontifical approval from Pope Pius XII. It has become one of the largest existing Catholic organization for lay faithful in the Catholic Church, existing in 90 countries. Opus Dei is formally known as the Prelature of the Holy Cross and Opus Dei.

Since its establishment, numerous faithful have earned a reputation for holiness and eventually canonized or beatified. The first to reach the glories of the altar was Escrivá, who was canonized in 2002 by Pope John Paul II. He was followed by his successor, Bishop Alvaro del Portillo, who was beatified in 2014. In 2019, Guadalupe Ortiz de Landázuri Fernández de Heredia, was beatified, the first lay faithful of Opus Dei to be given such an honor.

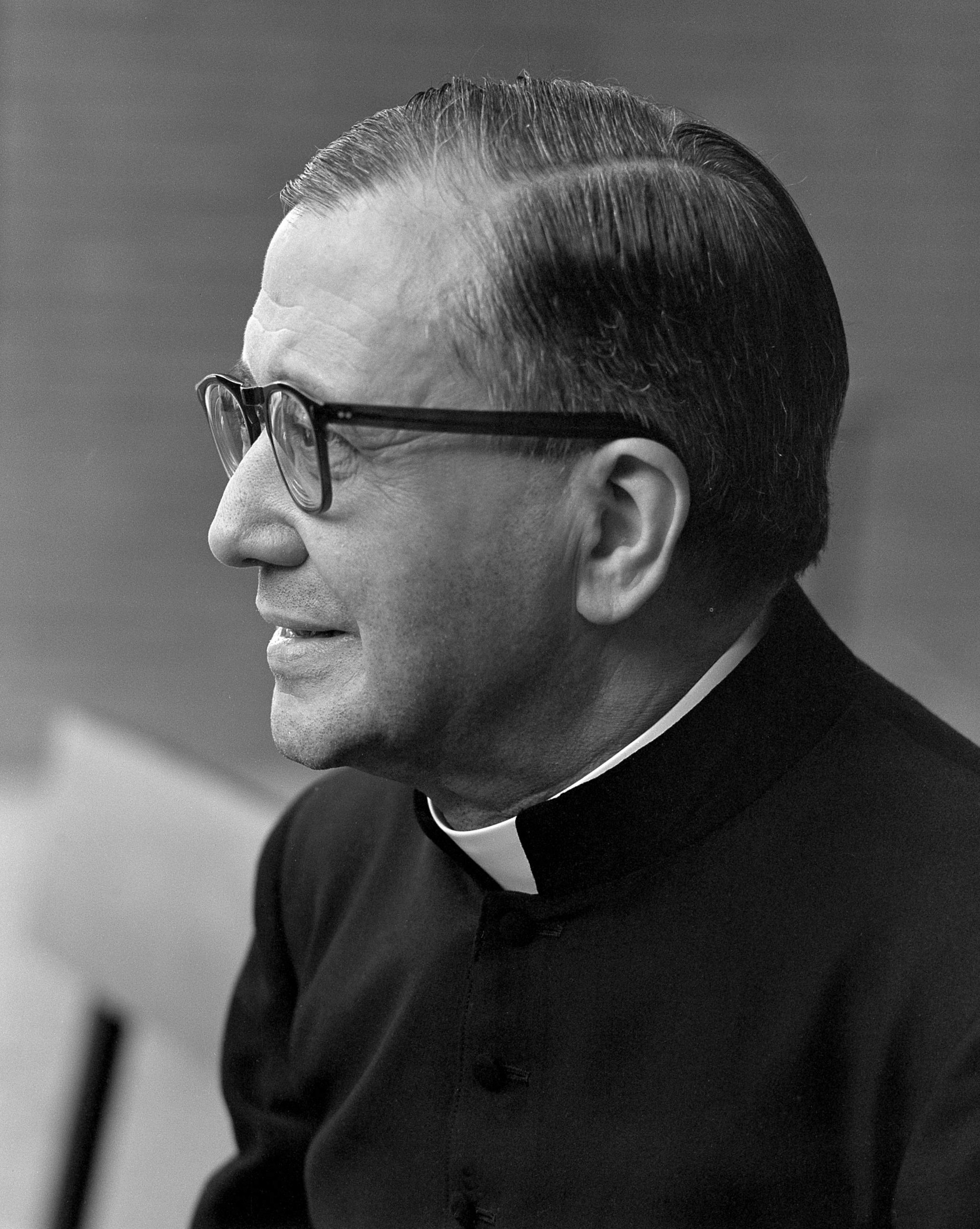
Josemaría Escrivá

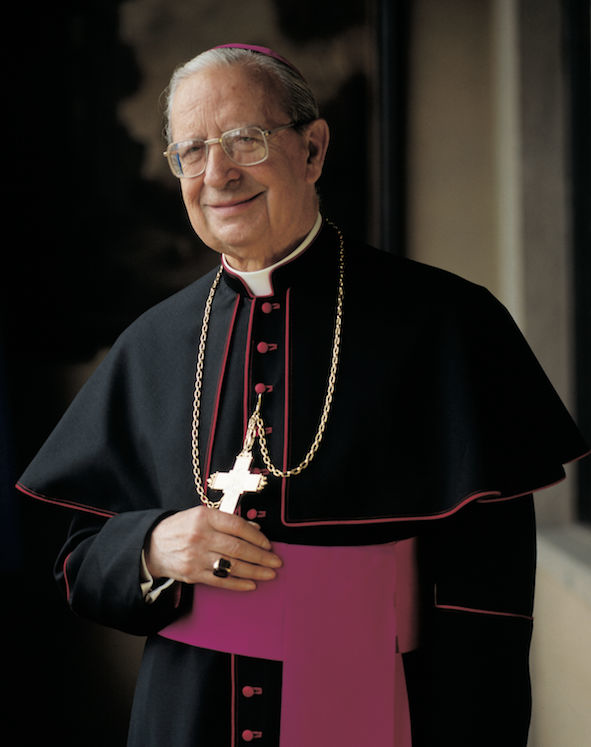
Bp. Álvaro del Portillo

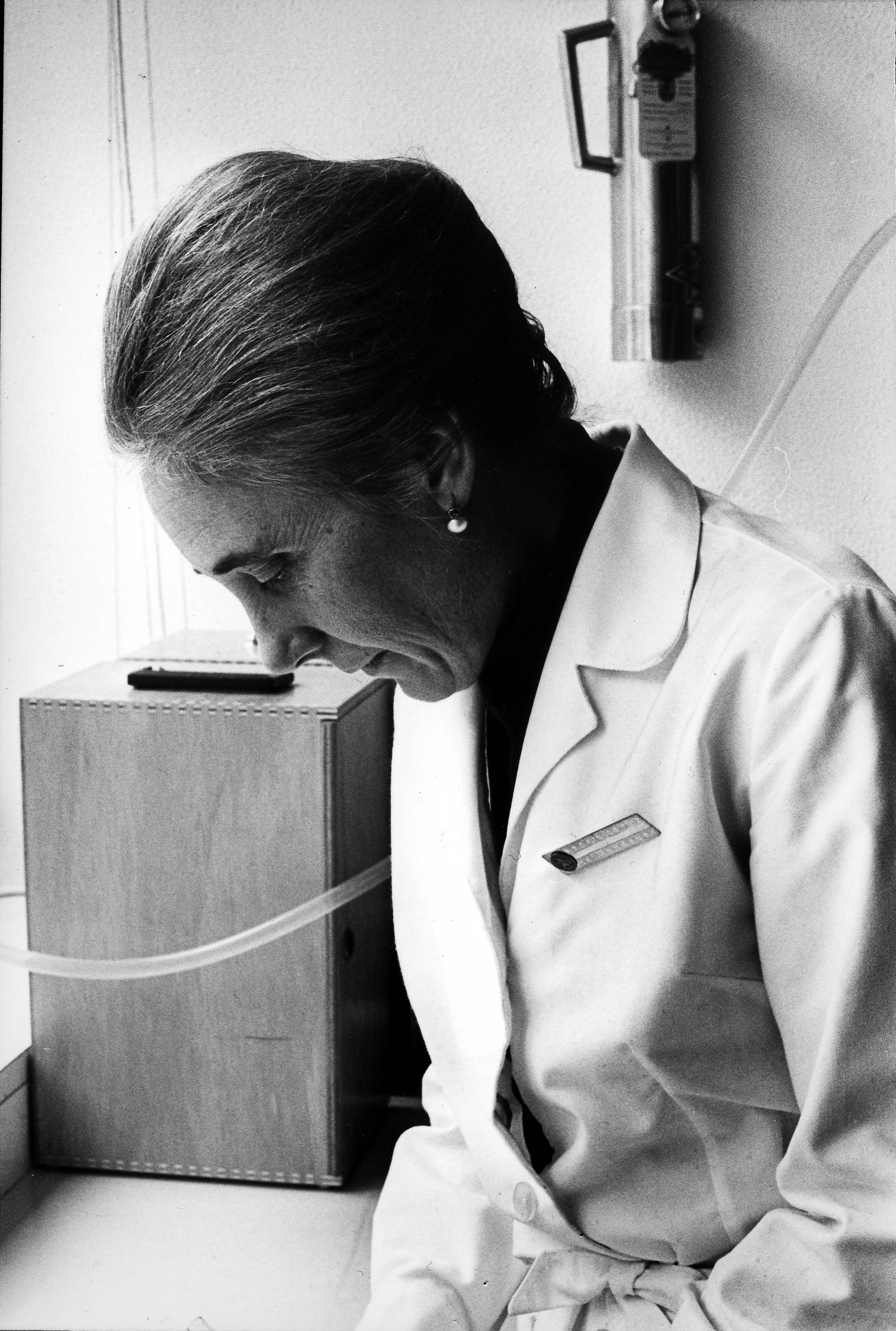
Guadalupe Ortiz de Landazuri

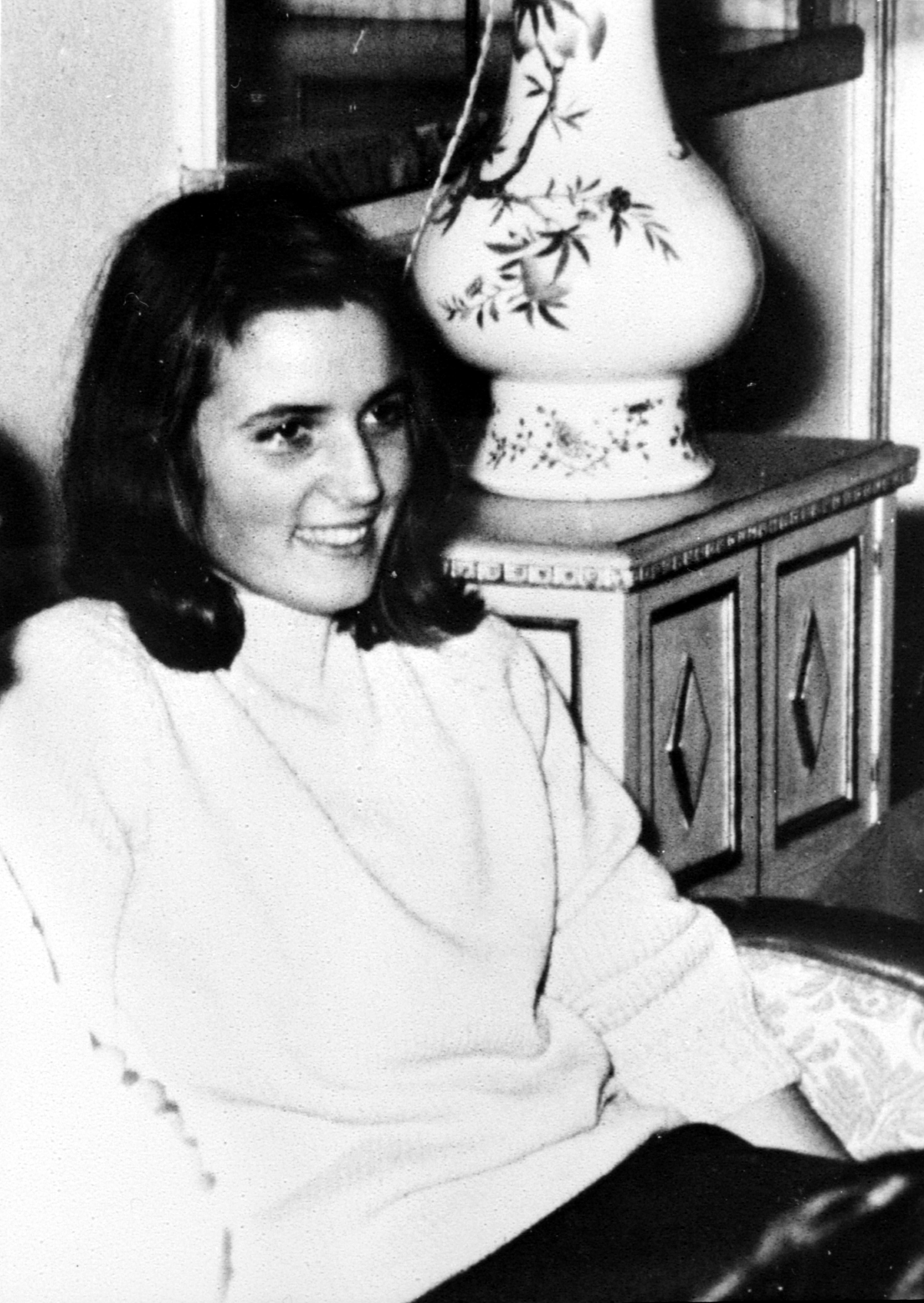
Montse Grases

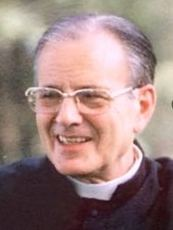
Fr. Joseph Muzquiz

Dr. Ernesto Cofiño

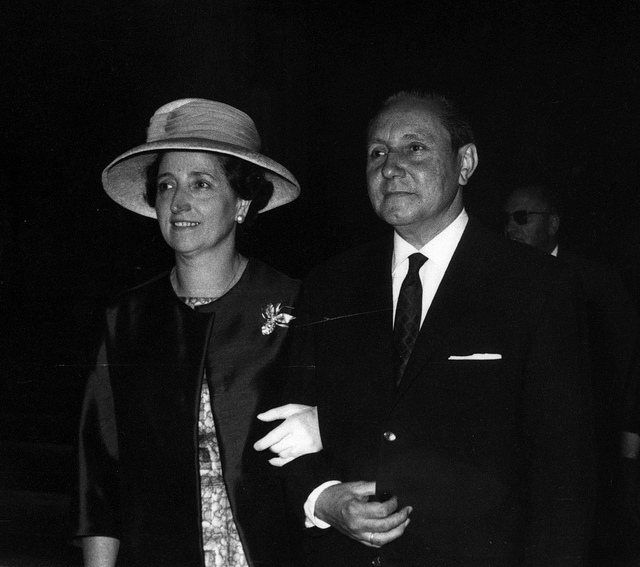
Tomas and Paquita Alvira

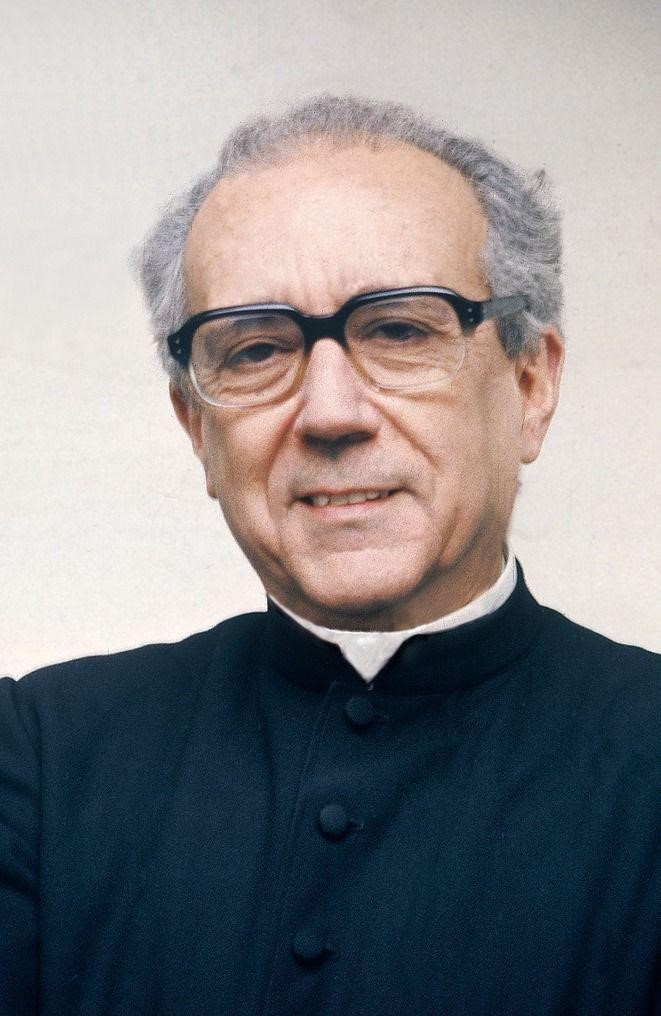
Bp. Adolfo Rodríguez Vidal

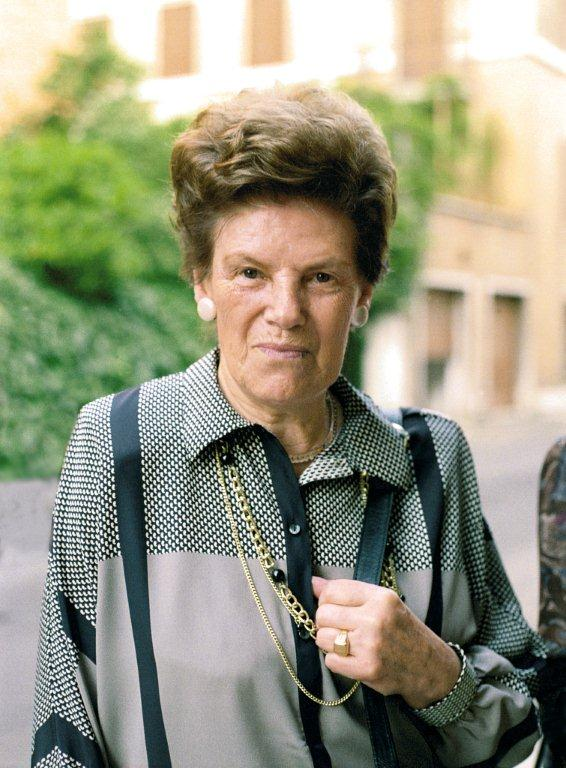
Dora del Hoyo

== Saints ==
- Josemaría Escrivá de Balaguer Albás (1902–1975), Priest of the Archdiocese of Madrid; Founder of Opus Dei (Huesca, Spain – Rome, Italy)
  - Declared "Venerable": April 9, 1990
  - Beatified: May 17, 1992 by Pope John Paul II
  - Canonized: October 6, 2002 by Pope John Paul II

== Blesseds ==
- Álvaro del Portillo Diez de Sollano (1914–1994), Prelate of Opus Dei (Madrid, Spain – Rome, Italy)
  - Declared "Venerable": June 28, 2012
  - Beatified: September 27, 2014 by Cardinal Angelo Amato, S.D.B.
- Guadalupe Ortiz de Landázuri Fernández de Heredia (1916–1975), Spanish chemical engineer; numerary (Madrid – Navarra, Spain)
  - Declared "Venerable": May 4, 2017
  - Beatified: May 18, 2019 by Cardinal Giovanni Angelo Becciu

== Venerables ==
- María Montserrat Grases García (1941–1959), Catalan university student; numerary (Barcelona, Spain)
  - Declared "Venerable": April 26, 2016
- Isidoro Zorzano Ledesma (1902–1943), Argentinian industrial engineer; numerary (Buenos Aires, Argentina – Madrid, Spain)
  - Declared "Venerable": December 21, 2016
- Alexia González-Barros González (1971–1985), Spanish school girl; cooperator (Madrid – Navarra, Spain)
  - Declared "Venerable": July 5, 2018
- Ernesto Guillermo Cofiño Ubico (1899–1991), Guatemalan pediatrician; supernumerary (Guatemala City, Guatemala)
  - Declared "Venerable": December 14, 2023

== Servants of God ==
- José María Hernández Garnica (1913–1972), Spanish priest and civil engineer (Madrid – Barcelona, Spain)
- Fernando Crespo Alfageme (1907–1976) and María Lourdes de Miguel Crespo de Crespo (1913–1983), Spanish couple; supernumerary (León, Spain)
- José Luis Múzquiz de Miguel (1912–1983), Spanish priest and canon lawyer (Badajoz, Spain – Massachusetts, United States)
- Eduardo Ortiz de Landázuri Fernández de Heredia (1910–1985), Spanish physician; supernumerary (Segovia – Navarra, Spain)
- Antonio [Toni] Zweifel (1938–1989), Swiss mechanical engineer; numerary (Verona, Italy – Zürich, Switzerland)
- Jeremy Joyner White (1938–1990), English professor and historian; numerary (England, United Kingdom – Lagos, Nigeria)
- Arturo Álvarez Ramírez (1935–1992), Mexican engineer; associate (Estado de México – Jalisco, Mexico)
- Tomás Alvira y Alvira (1906–1992), Spanish chemist and professor; supernumerary (Zaragoza – Madrid, Spain)
- Francisca [Paquita] Domínguez Susín de Alvira (1912–1994), Spanish school teacher; supernumerary (Huesca – Madrid, Spain)
- María Encarnación [Encarnita] Ortega Pardo (1920–1995), Spanish laywoman; numerary (Pontevedra – Navarra, Spain)
- Ruth Van Kooy Pakaluk (1957–1998), American anti-abortion activist; supernumerary (Massachusetts, United States)
- Laura Busca Otaegui de Ortiz de Landázuri (1918–2000), Spanish pharmacist; supernumerary (Guipúzcoa – Navarra, Spain)
- Adolfo Rodríguez Vidal (1920–2003), Bishop of Santa María de Los Ángeles (Tarragona, Spain – Santiago, Chile)
- Salvadora [Dora] Onorata del Hoyo Alonso (1914–2004), Spanish domestic worker; numerary assistant (León, Spain – Rome, Italy)
- Juan Ignacio Larrea Holguín (1927–2006), Archbishop of Guayaquil (Buenos Aires, Argentina – Quito, Ecuador)
- Marcelo Henrique Câmara (1979–2008), Brazilian lawyer; numerary (Santa Catarina, Brazil)

== Candidates for sainthood ==
- Carmen Escrivá de Balaguer y Albás (1899–1957), Spanish laywoman; cooperator (Zaragoza, Spain – Rome, Italy)
- Pepe Serret Borda (1941–1993), Spanish businessman; supernumerary ( Vallfogona de Balaguer – Barcelona, Spain)
- Francisco "Paco" González-Barros Albardonedo (1924–2001), Spanish businessman; supernumerary (Pontevedra – Madrid, Spain)
- Ramona "Moncha" González Penas de Gonzáles-Barros (1931–2006), Spanish housewife; supernumerary (Pontevedra – Madrid, Spain)
- Margaret Atieno Ogola (1958–2011), Kenyan physician and writer; supernumerary (Asembo – Nairobi, Kenya)
- Javier Echevarría Rodríguez (1932–2016), Prelate of Opus Dei (Madrid, Spain – Rome, Italy)
- Adoracion "Dory" Tañega (1929–2017), Filipino child psychiatrist; numerary (Manila, Philippines)
- Pedro Ballester Arenas (1996–2018), British chemical engineering student; numerary (England, United Kingdom)
- Placido Mapa Jr. (1932–2019), Filipino businessman and economist; supernumerary (Negros Occidental – Manila, Philippines)
- Richard "Dick" Rieman (1925–2019), American priest (Illinois – Massachusetts, United States)
