= Placido Mapa Jr. =

Filipino businessman, economist and government official

Placido L. Mapa Jr.

2nd Director-General of the National Economic and Development Authority Concurrently Minister of Economic Planning
- In office 1981–1983
- President: Ferdinand Marcos
- Preceded by: Gerardo Sicat
- Succeeded by: Cesar Virata

Personal details
- Born: June 24, 1932 Talisay, Negros Occidental, Philippines
- Died: May 5, 2019 (aged 86)
- Education: Harvard University; Ateneo de Manila University
- Occupation: Banker businessman
- Profession: Economist

Placido "Cidito" Ledesma Mapa Jr. (June 24, 1932 – May 5, 2019) a Filipino businessman, economist, and government official best known for having served as the second head of the National Economic and Development Authority (NEDA), which is the Philippines' highest economic and development planning body. He was once governor of the Development Bank of the Philippines (DBP). Between the years 1970-1980 he also held the positions of Alternate Executive Director for the Philippines of the International Monetary Fund and Executive Director of World Bank. He was President of the Philippine Economic Society from 1965 to 1966.

He served Metropolitan Bank & Trust Company (Metrobank) for over 30 years in various capacities including President and vice-chairman. During his stint with Metrobank, he was also President of the Bankers Association of the Philippines. He was also the President of the Metrobank Foundation, Inc., and chairperson of the Board of Advisers of Metrobank.

Mapa Jr. was the Founding Chairman of the Board of the Center for Research and Communication (CRC), and of the University of Asia and the Pacific which evolved from it. Mapa was also Founding Chairman of Parents for Education Foundation or PAREF. The educational philosophy of PAREF Schools is inspired by the teachings of St. Josemaria Escriva on two main ideas – (1) integral education; and (2) parents as the primary educators of their children. PAREF originally started with two schools in Muntinlupa, PAREF Woodrose for girls and PAREF Southridge for boys. To date, PAREF now has 17 schools nationwide.

He was a son of Placido Mapa Sr. who served as Mayor of Baguio City, President of Rehabilitation Finance Corp (RFC), the predecessor of Development Bank of the Philippines and founding President of Metrobank. He is also the of Nicholas Mapa, also a Filipino economist.

== Education ==
Mapa attended high school in De La Salle Manila (1951), obtained his A.B. from the Ateneo de Manila University, his M.A. from St. Louis University, and his PhD in economics from Harvard University in Cambridge, Massachusetts. Mapa, Placido L. Jr. | De La Salle Alumni Association

=== Opus Dei ===
It was at Harvard that Mapa first encountered and joined Opus Dei, becoming its first Filipino supernumerary member. He invited Bernardo Villegas, Jesus Estanislao, who were also studying in Harvard at the time, to the organization. Upon returning to the Philippines, they became the key figures in the establishment of Opus Dei's apostolate in the Philippines.

Mapa has been included in the list of candidates for sainthood

List of Opus Dei saints and beatified people

== Early career ==
After graduating from Harvard in 1962, Mapa briefly served in the private sector, working for the National City Bank of New York, which would later be renamed Citibank.

== Entering government service ==
In 1964, Mapa was recruited by President Diosdado Macapagal in 1964 to serve as Deputy Director General for the Program Implementation Agency (PIA), an advisory group Macapagal created to support the economic work of the Office of the President.

== Presidential Economic staff ==
A year later, Macapagal was defeated by Ferdinand Marcos in the 1965 Philippine Presidential Election. One of Marcos' early strategies for was to surround himself with US-trained economists, projecting his administration as young, modern, and professional. Along those lines, the new president retained Mapa as deputy at the PIS, despite having been a Macapagal appointee. Marcos then elevated Mapa Director General when he renamed the PIS as the Presidential Economic Staff (PES). Placed under him as deputies were Alejandro Melchor, whom Marcos would later appoint as executive secretary, and Cesar Zalamea who would later serve as DBP chair.

== DBP, IMF, NEDA and PNB ==
Mapa briefly rejoined the private sector in 1974, taking up a post as general manager of the Philippine Commercial & Industrial Bank, and then as president of the Philippine Foreign Loan & Guarantee Corporation.

In 1977, he was also appointed chairman of the board of the Development Bank of the Philippines (DBP).

He then moved to Washington D.C. to serve in the International Monetary Fund.

In 1981, Marcos once again tapped Mapa's services – this time to head the NEDA (National Economic & Development Authority) as its second Director General, after Gerardo Sicat.

He served until 1983 when he was appointed President of the Philippine National Bank. As President of PNB, he was also a member of the Monetary Board. Mapa's post at the NEDA was reassigned to Cesar Virata.

== Metrobank ==
After 1986, Mapa continued to serve in the banking sector. He was President of Metropolitan Bank and Trust Company (Metrobank) from 1989 to 1991, Vice chairman from 1992 to 2005, Chairman of the Metrobank Board of Advisers from 2006 to 2009 and Senior Adviser from 2010 to 2019.

Founded on September 5, 1962, Metropolitan Bank & Trust Co. (Metrobank) has since become the premier universal bank and among the foremost financial institutions in the Philippines. Mapa's father, Placido Mapa Sr. was the founding President of Metrobank. The Bank offers a full range of banking and other financial products and services, including corporate, commercial and consumer banking, as well as credit card, remittances, leasing, investment banking and trust banking. It established Metrobank Foundation, Inc. in 1979, putting emphasis on both business success and community contribution. The Foundation has since become one of the largest and most respected charitable organizations in Asia.

Mapa also served as President of Metrobank Foundation, Inc. and also became a Senior Adviser to the Foundation.

During his stint in Metrobank, he was also concurrently President of the Bankers Association of the Philippines (BAP) from 2000 to 2001 and eventually became a Member of the Advisory Council of the BAP.

== Death ==
In May 2019, the University of Asia and the Pacific, on whose board Mapa sat as Chair, reported that he had died May 5, 2019.

Mapa's death was also reported by Gerardo Sicat in his column in Philippine Star on May 8, 2019

Economist Placido Mapa Jr. passes on at 86 - Bilyonaryo Business News

A testimonial was also published in the UA&P website

Placido Ledesma Mapa, Jr.

He is survived by his wife Ma. Corazon Tinio Mapa, his nine children and three grandchildren.

In 2022, the UA&P established the Dr. Placido L. Mapa, Jr. Scholarship Endowment. In 2023, UA&P signed a Memorandum of Agreement with GT Foundation and Metrobank Foundation, recognizing both foundations as Platinum donors to the Dr. Placido L. Mapa, Jr. Scholarship Endowment.

UA&P establishes Dr. Placido L. Mapa, Jr. Scholarship Endowment - UA&P

GT Foundation and Metrobank Foundation Joint-Donation for Dr. Placido L. Mapa, Jr. Scholarship Endowment » Metrobank Foundation

Preceded by Gerardo Sicat	Director-General of the National Economic and Development Authority; 1981–1983	Succeeded by Cesar Virata
