= Priestly Society of the Holy Cross =

Association of Catholic priests attached to Opus Dei

Seal of the Prelature of Opus Dei and the Priestly Society of the Holy Cross

The Priestly Society of the Holy Cross is an association of Catholic diocesan priests which is integrally united to the Prelature of Opus Dei.

Part of the society is made up of the clergy of the Opus Dei prelature-members of the priesthood who fall under the jurisdiction of the Opus Dei prelature are automatically members of the Priestly Society. Other members in the society are traditional diocesan priests-clergy who remain under the jurisdiction of their diocesan bishop. They have the same vocation to holiness through ordinary life and work as all the other members of Opus Dei, with a special concern of promoting priestly vocation and being "a leaven of unity with the bishops, and of fraternity within the presbyterate" of their diocese.

== Foundation and mission ==
The Priestly Society of the Holy Cross was begun by St. Josemaría Escrivá on 14 February 1943, and received its first canonical approval a few months later. He was always concerned that his message of sanctification of ordinary work be transmitted also to the secular clergy. He even said that he was willing to leave Opus Dei, as Abraham offered up his son Isaac, to be able to help the clergy. But on February 14, 1943, he said he received an illumination from God on how to continue serving both the laity and the diocesan clergy.

During Mass at the women's center of Opus Dei, he was shown the seal of Opus Dei and of the Priestly Society of the Holy Cross: a cross embracing the world. He was also shown the juridical solution to put the two together. The priests would be part of a society united to Opus Dei, but the diocesan priests would continue to be priests of their dioceses, and thus there will be no conflict with the bishops.

The first priests of the Priestly Society were the numerary members of Opus Dei, who as such are automatically members of the Society. The first three priests ordained as members of the Society were: Álvaro del Portillo, José Luis Muzquiz and José María Hernández Garnica.

The need for this type of association has been explained in the following way:

As many priests can testify, loneliness can be the most difficult Cross to embrace. However, there are remedies for loneliness, and priests are free to seek for that help upon which their happiness largely relies. Diocesan priests can certainly establish their own support groups for prayer, socializing, exercise, and relaxation. But normally that is not enough. In #29 of the DLMP, the document, echoing the Second Vatican Council (Presbyterorum ordinis, #8) and the Code of Canon Law (C 550, n. 2), highly praises “those associations which support priestly fraternity, sanctity in the exercise of their ministry, and communion with the Bishop and with the entire Church”.

== Establishment by Pope John Paul II ==
According to the Apostolic Constitution Ut sit issued by John Paul II: “From its beginnings, this (Opus Dei) has in fact striven, not only to illuminate with new lights the mission of the laity in the Church and in society, but also to put it into practice; it has also endeavored to put into practice the teaching of the universal call to sanctity, and to promote at all levels of society the sanctification of ordinary work, and by means of ordinary work. Furthermore, through the Priestly Society of the Holy Cross, it has helped diocesan priests to live this teaching, in the exercise of their sacred ministry.”

Through this document, John Paul II, aside from erecting Opus Dei as a personal prelature, also erected the Priestly Society of the Holy Cross “as a priestly Association intrinsically united to the Prelature.”

== Composition ==
It is made up first of all of the clergy of the Prelature who are automatically members. Secondly, it is made up of diocesan priests, deacons, and bishops. Some Opus Dei members also serve as bishops in various dioceses throughout the world, including the United States, Europe, South America, Africa and China. The prelate of Opus Dei is the president of the society.

These diocesan clergy of the Priestly Society are not incardinated into the presbyterate of the Prelature. They depend solely on their bishop and receive spiritual help from the Society to fulfill their priestly duties well.

According to the Annuario Pontificio, there were 1996 priests of the Prelature in the year 2009. John Allen stated there were roughly two thousand diocesan priests who belonged to society who were not clergy of the prelature, thus the total membership of the society is around 4000 priests.

== Formation ==
The priests are given the same formation as the lay faithful of Opus Dei. St. Josemaría always said that he has “the same cooking pot” for his children: classes on doctrine, ascetical formation, spiritual direction, recollections, retreats, etc.

== Membership ==
There are around 4000 priests, bishops and deacons around the world who are members of the Priestly Society of the Holy Cross.

As the official website explains: "Numerary and coadjutor members are drawn from the Prelature's lay faithful (Numeraries and Associates), who receive Holy Orders after the necessary preparation. They are incorporated into the Priestly Society of the Holy Cross upon their ordination as deacons.

== See also ==
- Types of membership of Opus Dei

== Sources ==
- Pope John Paul II. Apostolic Constitution Ut Sit Establishing the Personal Prelature of Opus Dei and the Vatican Declaration on Opus Dei
- Pope John Paul II. Christifideles Omnes, Papal Decree on Escriva's Heroic Virtues
- Cardinal José Saraiva Martins, St. Josemaría: God's Instrument for Opus Dei - statement of the Prefect of the Congregation for the Causes of Saints on St. Josemaría and Opus Dei's message of sanctity
- Escrivá, Josemaría. The Way, Furrow, The Forge, Christ is Passing By, Friends of God, Loyalty to the Church, Conversations with Msgr. Josemaría Escrivá, Scepter Publishers—the founder's teachings and explanations about Opus Dei; the most basic reference
- Müller, Beat. Opus Dei Information Handbook—a basic text given to journalists
- Shaw, Russel (1994). Ordinary Christians in the World --- from the Office of Communications, Prelature of Opus Dei in the US
- Belda, M.; Escudero J.; Illanes, J.L. & O'Callaghan, P., eds. (1997). Holiness and the World: Studies in the Teachings of Blessed Josemaría Escrivá. Scepter Publications.—collection of contributions to a theological symposium; contributors include Ratzinger, del Portillo, Cottier, dalla Torre, Ocariz, Illanes, Aranda, Burggharf and an address by John Paul II ISBN 1-890177-04-0
- Berglar, Peter (1994). Opus Dei. Life and Work of its Founder. Scepter Publishers—in-depth historical study; available on-line
- Fuenmayor, Amadeo; Gomez-Iglesias, Valentin & Illanes, Jose Luis (1996). The Canonical Path of Opus Dei. Four Courts Press. ISBN 1-85182-221-6.—in-depth juridical study
- Le Tourneau, Dominique (2002). What Is Opus Dei?. Gracewing. ISBN 0-85244-136-3.—a basic text; a French scholar's synthesis
- Rodriguez, Pedro; Ocariz, Fernando & Illanes, José Luis (1994). Opus Dei in the Church. Four Courts Press. ISBN 1-85182-170-8.—in-depth ecclesiological study
- Romano, Giuseppe (1995). Opus Dei: Who? How? Why?. Alba House. ISBN 0-8189-0739-8.
- Pakaluk, Michael (June 1978). "Opus Dei In Everyday Life". The Family.—a typical day in the life of a member of Opus Dei
- Allen, John Jr. (2005). Opus Dei: an Objective Look Behind the Myths and Reality of the Most Controversial Force in the Catholic Church, Doubleday Religion. ISBN 0-385-51449-2 — book written after 300 hours of interviews by a journalist of National Catholic Reporter, a left leaning newspaper
- Allen, John Jr. (2005). Opus Dei: An Introduction, Chapter I: A Quick Overview, Chapter 4: Contemplatives in the Middle of the World, Chapter 7: Opus Dei and Secrecy - 4 on-line excerpts from John Allen's Opus Dei
- Allen, John Jr. (24 March 2005). "Decoding Opus Dei". An Interview with John Allen, by Edward Pentin. Newsweek. -- a short summary of his book
- Allen, John Jr. (January 2006). "Unveiling Opus Dei". An Interview with John Allen, by John Romanowsky. Godspy.
