= Dora del Hoyo =

Servant of God Dora del Hoyo
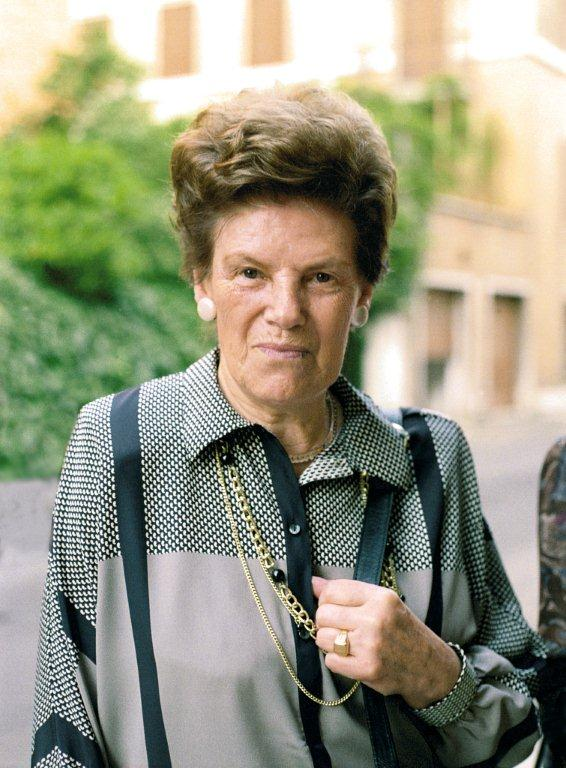
- Born: Salvadora Honorata del Hoyo Alonso; 11 January 1914; Boca de Huérgano, León, Spain
- Died: 10 January 2004 (aged 89); Rome, Italy

Dora del Hoyo Alonso, (11 January 1914 – 10 January 2004; born Salvadora Honorata del Hoyo Alonso in Leon, Spain) was a Spanish Catholic laywoman who was one of the first female members of Opus Dei.

A domestic worker by profession, del Hoyo was the first to join the Prelature of Opus Dei as an assistant numerary meaning that she dedicated herself professionally to caring for people and looking after the material needs of Opus Dei centers. From 1946 until her death, she lived in Rome, Italy where she collaborated first with Josemaría Escrivá de Balaguer, Opus Dei's founder, and later on with his successors Álvaro del Portillo and Bishop Javier Echevarría, in the domestic management of the first Opus Dei center there, later the movement's headquarters.

== Biography ==
Dora del Hoyo was born on January 11, 1914, in the village of Boca de Huérgano in Leon, Spain, the fifth of six children. Her father, Demetrio del Hoyo, was a farm-laborer and her mother, Carmen Alonso, a home-maker. To support her family, at an early age del Hoyo began working as a housekeeper for the village doctor. In 1935, del Hoyo decided to look for better housework opportunities in Astorga, León, but the onset of the Spanish Civil War (1936-1939) caused her to have to return to her hometown.

In 1940, del Hoyo moved to Madrid, once again in search of better opportunities. Through the help of the Daughters of Mary Immaculate for Domestic Service (a religious congregation founded by Vincentia Maria López y Vicuña and dedicated to helping young girls find employment in household work), del Hoyo got hired as a housemaid for the Marquess of Almunia, and later on for the Dukes of Nájera.

In 1944, del Hoyo was still working for the Duke when she came in contact with Opus Dei. Josemaria Escriva, founder of the then-new Opus Dei movement, had turned to the Daughters for Domestic Service for help in hiring household employees for a student dormitory he was opening called the Moncloa Residence. The Mother Superior of the Domestic Service Daughters recommended del Hoyo, who happened to have some days off at the time. In spite of the low pay offered and her little desire to go, at the nun's insistence del Hoyo agreed to help out the residence for a few days.

Later on, del Hoyo decided to give up the job at the Dukes of Nájera to devote herself full-time to the Moncloa, even though the pay there was lower and the working conditions significantly worse. Later on when asked why she did this, del Hoyo said that she was moved "to see how hard they worked" and that she was also impressed by Escriva and his teaching. Commenting on Escriva's The Way, del Hoyo recalled, "I was very enthused ... with each thing that I heard, I thought, 'This is for me'. I liked it a lot and I read it all in one sitting – I couldn't go to bed without finishing it".

On 14 March 1946, del Hoyo joined Opus Dei as an assistant numerary, meaning that, in addition to committing to live according to Opus Dei's spirit and "plan of life", she had decided to dedicate herself professionally to caring for the household needs of Opus Dei centers – cleaning, laundry, meals, and other aspects of care of the home — and thus contribute with her work of domestic service to Opus Dei's mission of spreading the universal call to holiness in ordinary life. Since an important consequence of Escriva's message of sanctifying any honest work looks in a special way to the care of the home, something which Escriva valued for its intrinsic relation to the family and education of children, del Hoyo's decision to devote herself entirely to this endeavor is seen as a historical moment for Opus Dei.

In December 1946, del Hoyo moved to Rome at Escriva's request to take charge of the domestic management of the first Opus Dei center there, a center which would later be Opus Dei's central headquarters. From Rome, her place of residence until her death in 2004, del Hoyo played a central role in the teaching and training of women from all over the world in the tasks that encompass the work of the home. Escriva spoke of this training in a famous interview, when asked about women who devote themselves to housework:

"The main aim of this (training) is to dignify the work of domestic staff in such a way that they can do their work with a scientific approach. I say 'with a scientific approach' because housework should be carried out as a true profession. We must not forget that there are people who have wanted to present this work as something humiliating, but it is not. No doubt, the conditions under which this work used to be done were humiliating and sometimes they still are, even today, when domestic staff are subjected in their work to the whim of an arbitrary employer who does not guarantee their rights, and who gives them low wages and no affection... Any job that is well done is a wonderful service to society, and this is as true of domestic work as it is of the work of a professor or judge. The only work that is not a service is that of a person who works for his own self-interest...I understand that work in the home is especially important because through it so much good or harm can be done to families."

Del Hoyo died in Rome on 10 January 2004, after battling illness for several years. Her beatification process opened eight years later, on 18 June 2012 in Rome. On March 29, 2014, a commemorative ceremony took place in del Hoyo's hometown of Boca de Huergano to honor the centennial of her birth. Her mortal remains lie close to the tomb of Escriva, in the crypt of Our Lady of Peace Church in Rome.

== Beatification process ==
On June 18, 2012, Echevarría presided at the opening of the canonical process on the life and virtues of Dora del Hoyo. Jose Luis Gutierrez was named the postulator of del Hoyo's Cause of Canonization. According to Gutierrez, "Presenting this kind of work as a path of holiness recognised by the Church will encourage the many faithful Christians who are enmeshed in the thousand circumstances of ordinary life and it is also a valuable contribution to the good of society."

According to Echevarría, “Dora was very important for Opus Dei, because of her faithfulness and her work well done, always with the humble desire to pass unnoticed, to ‘do and disappear.’ She took the Blessed Virgin Mary as her teacher, as Saint Josemaría had encouraged her, and because of this she was effective to the very end of her life. She wanted no glory or recognition, and she gave one hundred percent throughout her entire life."
