= Joseph Muzquiz =

Servant of God Joseph Múzquiz
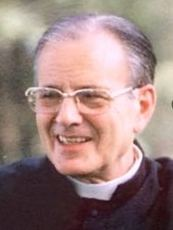

Priest
- Born: José Luis Múzquiz de Miguel; 14 October 1912; Badajoz, Spain
- Died: 21 June 1983 (aged 70); Pembroke, Massachusetts, United States
- Venerated in: Roman Catholic Church
- Feast: 21 June

Joseph Muzquiz (boen José Luis Múzquiz y de Miguel; 1912-1983) was a Spanish Catholic priest who was an early member of Opus Dei. He worked to establish the movement around the world. The cause for his canonization was opened by the Archdiocese of Boston in 2011.

== Biography ==
He was born José Luis Múzquiz y de Miguel in Badajoz, Spain, on 14 October 1912. He went to Madrid to study engineering, and it was there that he met Josemaría Escrivá, the future founder of the Opus Dei movement. He joined the Nationalist army during the Spanish Civil War when Nationalist forces occupied his city. After the war, he was admitted to the newly founded Opus Dei in January 1940.

Muzquiz continued in his profession, working on the reconstruction of the nation's infrastructure, building bridges around the country. He went on to earn three doctorates in total: in civil engineering, history and in canon law. He lived out his religious commitment through evangelization among his friends and colleagues.

He was one of the first three members of Opus Dei to be ordained to the priesthood on 25 June 1944. He was sent to the United States in 1949, where he helped establish Opus Dei centers in Chicago and Washington, D.C. He also laid the foundations for Opus Dei's work in Canada, Japan and Venezuela. During the 1960s and 1970s, he worked in Europe and Asia and pressed for the canonization of the organization's founder.

He returned to the United States in 1976, settling at Arnold Hall Conference Center, an Opus Dei apostolate based in Pembroke, Massachusetts. On 20 June 1983, he suffered a heart attack while teaching a class there, and died the following day at Jordan Hospital in Plymouth. His funeral was held at the former St. Aidan's Church in Brookline and he was buried at St. Joseph's Cemetery in West Roxbury.

The cause for his canonization was opened on 2 June 2011, under the authority of the Archbishop of Boston, Cardinal Seán Patrick O'Malley, in whose jurisdiction Muzquiz died.
