= Toni Zweifel =

Swiss engineer (1938–1989)

Servant of God Toni Zweifel
- Born: 15 February 1938; Verona, Italy
- Died: 24 November 1989 (aged 51)
- Resting place: Fluntern Cemetery, Zürich
- Engineering career
- Discipline: Mechanical engineering

Toni Zweifel (15 February 1938 – 24 November 1989) was a Swiss Catholic engineer who patented several inventions. He founded and served as director of the Limmat Foundation, a foundation that supports social projects all over the world with a majority of women as project beneficiaries. He was a numerary member of the Opus Dei. A beatification process for Zweifel has been opened, and he is therefore titled a Servant of God.
