= Montserrat Grases =

Venerable María Montserrat Grases García
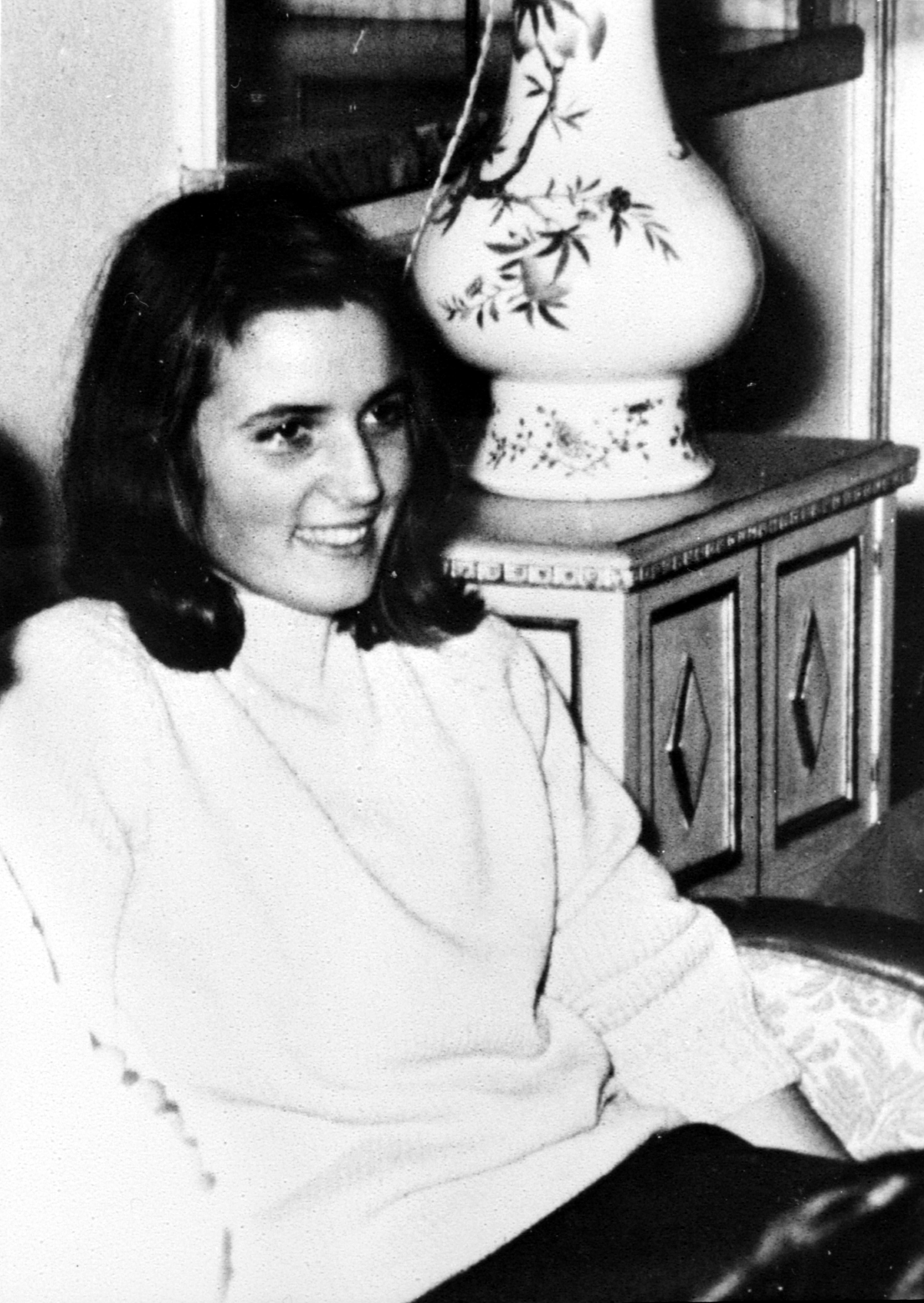
- Photograph of 13 November 1958
- Born: 10 July 1941; Barcelona, Spain
- Died: 26 March 1959 (aged 17); Barcelona, Spain

María Montserrat Grases García (10 July 1941 – 26 March 1959) was a Catalan Catholic laywoman who was a secular member of Opus Dei. Grases became part of Opus Dei on 24 December 1957 after she discerned whether or not her path would allow her to join their ranks. Her cheerfulness and friendship with others made her a known figure for her piety and her compassionate nature towards the poor and the ill since she would often catechize to children and tend to the poor in the poor regions in Barcelona alongside her friends.

Grases further continued her studies despite her bone cancer and she continued to demonstrate a cheerful demeanor centered on offering her suffering for Opus Dei's founder Josemaría Escrivá and for Pius XII and John XXIII, who both reigned during her illness. She died in 1959 at the age of 17.

The cause for her beatification commenced on 19 December 1962, thus making her a Servant of God. The confirmation of her heroic virtue on 26 April 2016 allowed for Pope Francis to title Grases as venerable.

== Life ==
María Montserrat Grases García was born in Barcelona on 10 July 1941 as the second of nine children to Manuel Grases and Manolita García. Her baptism was celebrated on 19 July in the church of Nuestra Señora del Pilar. People knew her with affection as "Montse". Her parents sought to create a climate in which sincere faith was fostered with great respect for their children's freedom.

In late 1942 she suffered from bronchitis but remedies failed to work promoting constant care for her condition which improved and was gone in the summer of 1943. On 11 June 1944 – with her brothers Jorge and Enrique – she received her Confirmation at the parish of Santa María. Grases made her First Communion on 27 May 1948.

In October 1946 she began her schooling and in 1951 commenced her high school education under the care of nuns. Once she graduated from her high school education she continued her studies at the Professional College for Women in Barcelona while alternating that with piano courses. Grases liked sport and music as well as traditional local dances; he favorite dance was the "sardanas". Her friends would go with her on frequent trips to the poor regions to teach catechism to children and often bought them sweets. Grases liked netball and tennis as well as outings with friends and participating in theatrical works. Grases also climbed mountains near Seva where she liked to spend her summers and also liked ping-pong. In 1951 she was awarded a prize after winning a bike race. In 1954 she had her first encounter with Opus Dei but knew of them beforehand since her parents had joined in 1952. Her mother encouraged her to visit an Opus Dei center that offered classes to girls to help strengthen her faith and her spiritual life but there existed some doubts as to whether she wished to belong to Opus Dei. In 1956 she attended an Opus Dei retreat to discern her calling but did not come to a conclusion as to whether she desired to join Opus Dei. On 24 December 1957 she saw that God was calling her to the path of holiness offered in Opus Dei and she asked for admission into their ranks after seeking counsel from those around her. In 1958 she went skiing with friends at La Molina and injured her leg which caused pain over the course of several months prompting for her to be taken on 26 June 1958 to a Red Cross clinic for evaluation.

In June 1958 she was diagnosed with Ewing's sarcoma in one leg after having experienced great pain for several months. Once the news had been broken to her she was heard singing a Mexican song later on 27 June in Llar:

"When I was living so happily, without thinking of love, you wanted me to love you and I loved you passionately. And I will continue to love you even after death. For I love you with the soul, and the soul never dies".

The bone cancer caused intense pains which she bore with both a serene and heroic fortitude. Throughout her illness she never lost her contagious cheerfulness or her desire for friendship which sprang from her deep interior life and zeal for souls. It was as a result of this that she continued bringing friends and schoolmates closer to God. From 11 to 17 November 1958 she visited Rome where she got to see Pope John XXIII and also was able to meet Josemaría Escrivá on 13 November. He was to give her his blessing and she tried to kneel though Escrivá prevented her from doing so. He instead put his hands on her head and made the sign of the Cross on her forehead in blessing. It was upon her return home that her condition worsened and she found she was unable to sleep at night. Grases offered her pain for the founder and for the pope.

García died in Barcelona on 26 March 1959, Holy Thursday, at around 10 am after she tried to sit up in her bed. The girl died – according to witnesses – looking at a picture of the Mother of God. Her last words were: "How much I love You! When are You coming for me?" In 1994, her remains were exhumed and relocated in the crypt of the Oratory of Santa María de Bonaigua.

== Beatification process ==
The beatification process opened in Barcelona in an informative process that spanned from 19 December 1962 until 26 March 1968 collecting witness testimonies and documentation as well as Grases' spiritual writings. There were 27 testimonies collected from those who knew her on a personal level. The theologians inspected her spiritual writings and approved them of possessing no doctrinal errors on 22 February 1974 while the Congregation for the Causes of Saints validated the informative process in Rome on 15 May 1992. On 10 May 1993 a request was lodged to hold another process to collect additional documentation and testimonies though not required. This diocesan process opened on 10 June 1993 and closed later on 28 October 1993 collecting another 100 testimonies. The Congregation for the Causes of Saints later validated this process on 21 January 1994.

The postulation later submitted the positio to the Congregation for assessment in December 1999 though the cause remained inactive for sometime until 30 June 2015 when theologians provided an affirmative response and approved the cause after having inspected the dossier. Cardinal Angelo Amato chaired the session of the Congregation's members that approved the cause on 19 April 2016. Pope Francis confirmed that Grases had lived a life of heroic virtue and named her venerable on 26 April 2016. The postulator for this cause from 25 October 2013 is José Gutiérrez Gómez.
