= Guadalupe Ortiz de Landázuri Fernández de Heredia =

Spanish Roman Catholic Venerable Saint and Professor

Blessed Guadalupe Ortiz de Landázuri Fernández de Heredia
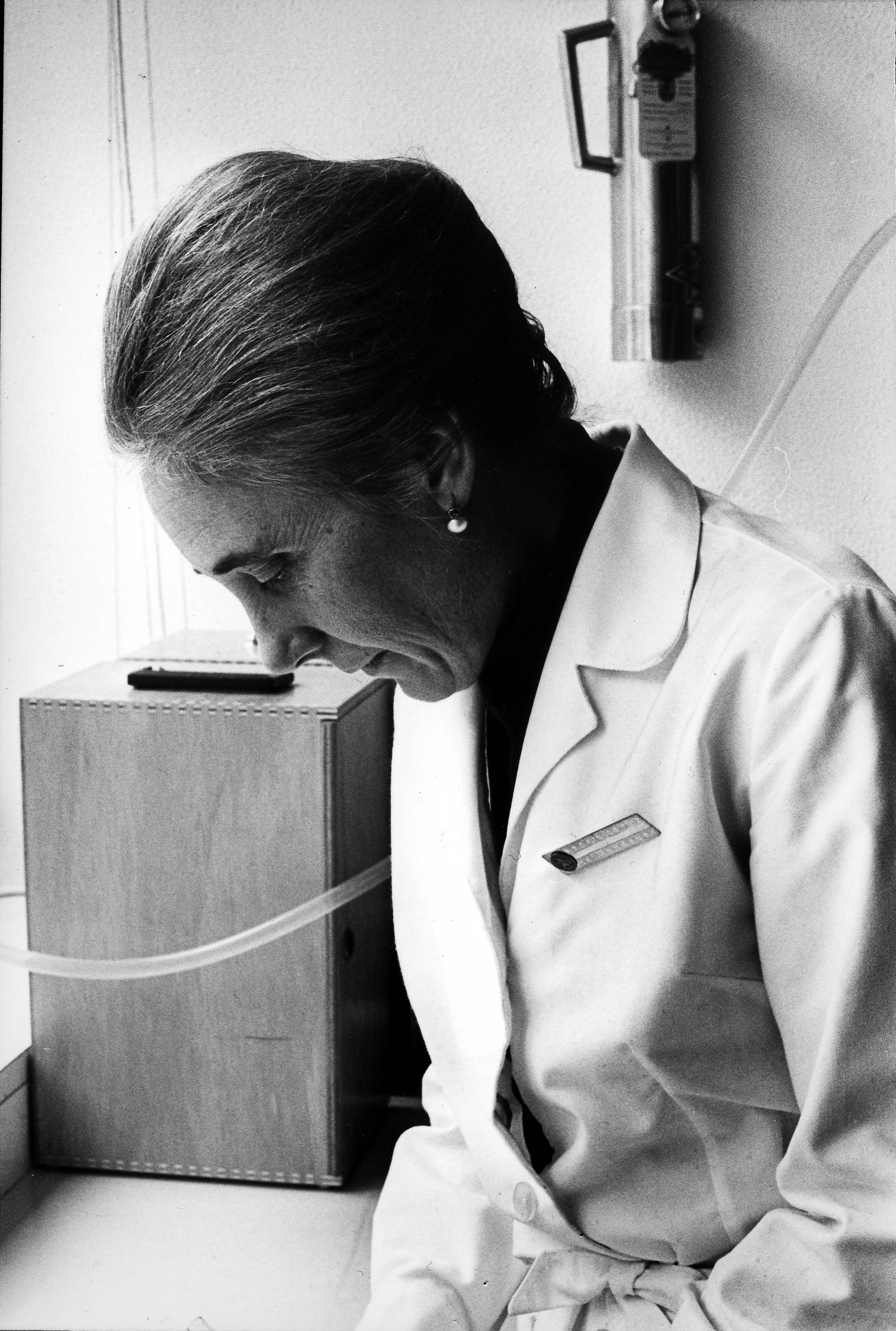
- Ortiz de Landázuri in mid-1972.
- Born: 12 December 1916; Madrid, Spain
- Died: 16 July 1975 (aged 58); Pamplona, Navarra, Spain
- Venerated in: Roman Catholic Church
- Beatified: 18 May 2019, Palacio Vistalegre, Madrid, Spain by Cardinal Giovanni Angelo Becciu
- Feast: 18 May

Guadalupe Ortiz de Landázuri Fernández de Heredia (12 December 1916 – 16 July 1975) was a Spanish Catholic professor and a member of Opus Dei. She was one of the first women to join Opus Dei, after meeting the founder Josemaría Escrivá in 1944. She helped start Opus Dei in Mexico and also collaborated directly with Escrivá in Rome. A serious heart condition eventually claimed her life in 1975.

After several requests from people who knew her during her life, her cause of canonization opened on 3 November 2001. In mid-2017, Pope Francis declared that she had lived a life of heroic virtue and named her Venerable. The same Pope confirmed a miracle attributed to her intercession (the healing of a cancer patient) in June 2018. Her beatification was celebrated on 18 May 2019 in Madrid.

== Life ==
Guadalupe Ortiz de Landázuri Fernández de Heredia was born in Madrid on 12 December 1916 as the fourth of four children (and the only daughter) to Manuel Ortiz de Landázuri, a military officer, and Eulogia Fernández-Heredia. Her three elder siblings were Manuel, Eduardo, and Francisco, who died in childhood. Her brother Eduardo (who became a doctor and college professor) and his wife (the two married in 1941) have both been named as Servants of God.

Her father's career in the armed forces meant the Ortiz de Landázuris moved from place to place each time he was sent on a new assignment. The Ortiz de Landázuri moved to Tétouan in Morocco in 1927 after her father was sent there for further work. In 1932, they returned to Spain and lived in Madrid where her father was named Lieutenant Colonel), and Guadalupe finished high school at the Instituto Miguel de Cervantes. In June 1933, she enrolled in the Universidad Central de Madrid in chemical science and was just one of five women in a class of 70 students. Ortiz de Landázuri eventually pursued a doctorate since she wanted to teach chemistry at the university level.

Crisis struck the nation with the outbreak of the Spanish Civil War in the mid-1930s. When her father was taken prisoner and condemned to execution, Ortiz de Landázuri accompanied her brother, Eduardo, and their mother to bid a final farewell, just hours before his death. It was after this, in 1937, that she relocated with Eduardo and their mother to Valladolid where her elder brother Manuel resided; she remained there until the civil war ended, just a few months before the outbreak of World War II.

She returned to Madrid in 1939 where she began her career as a teacher. One day at Mass in 1944, she felt something that she interpreted as being a sign from God. Ortiz de Landázuri returned home to consult with a friend and expressed a desire to speak with a priest. That friend gave her the phone number of a well-known priest Josemaría Escrivá and Ortiz de Landázuri met Escrivá for the first time on 25 January 1944. Shortly following this, Ortiz de Landázuri went on a spiritual retreat and on 19 March she sent a letter to Escrivá asking to be admitted to Opus Dei.

On 5 March 1951 - at Escrivá's invitation - she moved to Mexico to spread the message of Opus Dei. While there, Ortiz de Landázuri enrolled in a doctoral program in chemical sciences so she could continue what she had already started in Spain. In its capital she set up a student residence for university women, creating an environment conducive to serious study, healthy diversion, and friendship. She also helped establish the Montefalco School and other social projects aimed at improving opportunities for the local people. For example, together with a doctor friend, she created a mobile medical clinic that allowed them to go from house to house in poorer neighborhoods, providing both free medicine and medical tests.

Ortiz de Landázuri relocated to Rome in 1956 to work with Escrivá in the governance of Opus Dei. Not long after her arrival, she noted pain in her chest which turned out to be a serious heart condition, and she returned to Madrid for an operation. After partially recovering, she continued with her academic work, now in Spain. During this time, she began a research project on insulating refracting materials from rice husks; she won the prize Juan de la Cierva for this project and finally completed and defended her doctoral thesis on 8 July 1965. She also worked at the Ramiro de Maeztu Institute and then at the Women's School for Industrial Sciences where she took on a leadership position that she held for the next decade. From 1968, she also took part in the planning and establishment of the Center of Studies and Research of Domestic Sciences.

In 1975, the doctors said it would be best for them to operate again, despite there being some risks. Ortiz de Landázuri left her Madrid home to check into the Clínica Universidad de Navarra where she was operated on 1 July. Though the surgery was successful, she developed a sudden failure in respiration which caused her death on 16 July at 6:30 am; her mother died in the same clinic the next week on 23 July. Ortiz de Landázuri's remains were buried in Pamplona where she had died but were later transferred to Madrid on 5 October 2018.

== Beatification ==
In 2001 the Opus Dei prelate Javier Echevarría Rodríguez started the steps needed to launch the beatification process. The forum for the diocesan process for the cause was transferred on 30 March 2001 from the Pamplona-Tudela diocese to the Madrid archdiocese at which point the Congregation for the Causes of Saints on 3 November issued the "nihil obstat" (no objections) edit to begin the cause and to title her as a Servant of God. Cardinal Antonio María Rouco Varela opened the diocesan process on 18 November and later closed it on 18 March 2005. From 2002 to 2003 there were 66 sessions held with 32 witnesses from Madrid being called to provide evidence and interrogatories while another week-long session in mid-2003 in Mexico saw 22 witnesses giving evidence in support of Ortiz de Landázuri's virtues in 37 sessions. The C.C.S. later received all the documents gathered during that process in 2005 (3008 pages in seven compiled volumes) and validated the process later on 17 February 2006. The postulation later compiled and submitted the Positio dossier to the C.C.S. in 2009 for evaluation.

Theologians provided a positive vote to the cause on 7 June 2016 after having assessed the Positio's contents while the C.C.S. also provided their assent to the cause at their meeting held on 2 May 2017. Pope Francis titled Ortiz de Landázuri as Venerable on 4 May after determining that she had lived a model Christian life of heroic virtue.

Ortiz de Landázuri's beatification depended upon the confirmation of a singular miracle attributed to her intercession; it had to be a healing that science could not be able to explain. On the night of 28 November 2002 Antonio Jesús Sedano Madrid from Barcelona healed from basocellular carcinoma, with Sedano Madrid making a full recovery hours after his prayer. Cardinal Lluís Martínez Sistach presided over the dioscean process for confirming the miracle from 25 May 2007 until 16 January 2008 investigated. The C.C.S. validated this process on 24 October 2008 and a medical panel of experts later confirmed that the healing in question was indeed miraculous at their meeting held on 5 October 2017. The medical board also examined the diagnostic process of the ailment and the healing in just a few hours without treatment. The experts declared the occurrences not explicable from a scientific perspective. The postulation later drafted a Positio for the miracle which was submitted to the C.C.S. on 2 January 2018 before the theologians also issued their assent to the miracle on 1 March. The theologians determined the relationship between the healing and the invocation of Landázuri. The C.C.S. also confirmed the case on 5 June determining that it should be acknowledged as a miracle and passed to the pope for his approval. Pope Francis approved a decree recognizing this miracle on 8 June which allowed for Landázuri to be beatified. The beatification was held in Madrid at the Palacio Vistalegre on 18 May 2019.

Landázuri was the first lay member and the first female member of Opus Dei to be beatified.

The current postulator for this cause is Fr. Antonio Rodríguez de Rivera.
