= Ernesto Cofiño =

Guatemalan physician

Ernesto Cofiño, Guatemalan pioneer in pediatrics

Ernesto Cofiño (June 5, 1899 – October 17, 1991) was a Guatemalan Catholic physician. He was a pioneer in pediatric research in Guatemala. He founded hospitals, was director of Caritas de Guatemala, and promoted youth development. On December 14, 2023, Pope Francis approved Cofiño's practice of heroic virtue and declared him Venerable.

== Life and works ==
Ernesto Guillermo Cofiño was born in Guatemala City on June 5, 1899. He married in 1933 Clemencia Samayoa Rubio, and raised five children. He lived as a widower for 25 years, helping raise 21 grandchildren.

In 1919, he started his studies at the Faculty of Medicine of the University of Sorbonne, France. In 1929 he graduated as a surgeon. Cofiño was the first University Professor of Pediatrics in the Universidad de San Carlos de Guatemala medical school, where he taught for 24 years. He was a member of the American Academy of Pediatrics and the French Language Association of Pediatrics. He was involved in several medical positions:

- Sanatorio Antituberculoso Infantil in San Juan Sacatepéquez (Children's Antituberculosis Hospital) - Founder (1942)
- Unidad Asistencial de San Juan (St. John Assistantial Unit) - Founder (1946)
- Centro Educativo Asistencial (formerly Hospicio Nacional) - Director from 1951 to 1955
- Sociedad Protectora del Niño (Society for the Protection of children) - Director (1940–1946)
- Lucha Nacional contra la Tuberculosis (National Fight against Tuberculosis) - Director (1945–1946)
- Asociación de Guarderías Infantiles de Bienestar Social - Interventor (1954)
- Caritas de Guatemala - Director for 3 years. Organized the distribution of food for 90,000 from the poor villages
- Instituto Interamericano del Niño (Interamerican Institute for the Child)- Guatemalan Delegate (1945–1955)
- Fundación para el Desarrollo Integral (FUDI), a help to the victims of the earthquake of 1971, now the organizer of Centro de Formación Rural Utz Samaj - Cofounder

In 1945, Cofiño founded together with others the Pediatric Association of Guatemala. For the youth, he promoted the following:

- Centro Universitario Ciudad Vieja - First Rector (1958)
- Instituto Femenino de Estudios Superiores (IFES)
- Residencia de Estudiantes Verapaz
- Centro de Formación Profesional para la Mujer Junkabal
- Centro Educativo Técnico Laboral Kinal

He was also much involved in the movement to outlaw abortion, considered "one of the founders of the pro-life campaign" in Guatemala.

In 1956 Cofiño requested admission to Opus Dei. Through this, he was said to have learned how to sanctify his work, "imbuing his exquisite social sensibility and his great professional sense with an urgent zeal for the rechristianization of society".

When he was 80 years old, he was diagnosed with cancer in the jaw. He continued working until he finally succumbed to a resurgence of the cancer when he was 92.

== Beatification process ==
Cofiño's cause for beatication was opened on July 31, 2000, nine years after his death. On December 14, 2023, Pope Francis approved Cofiño's practice of heroic virtue and declared Cofiño venerable.

== Sources and external links ==
- Opening of Cause of Beatification
