= Isidoro Zorzano Ledesma =

Venerable Isidoro Zorzano Ledesma
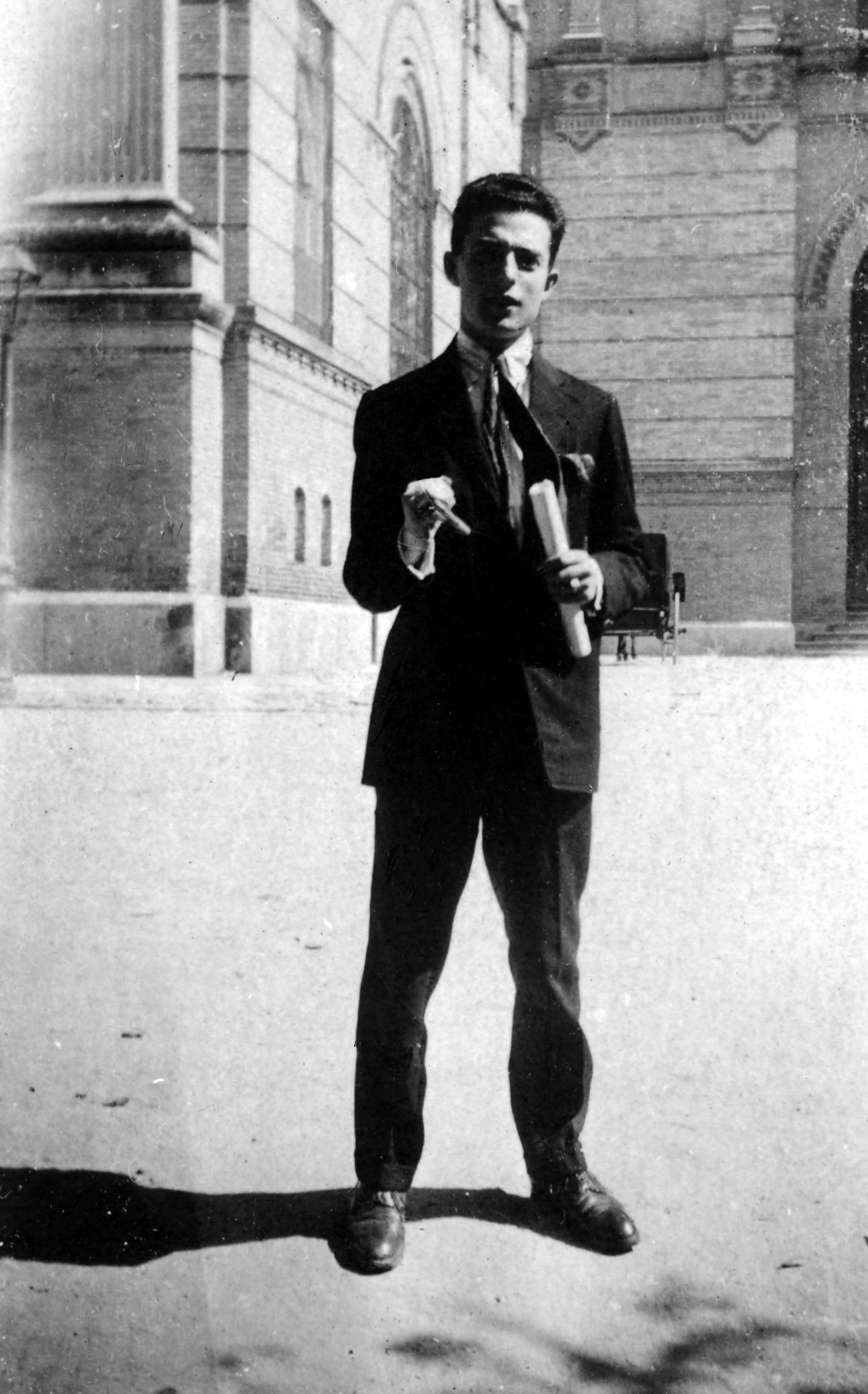
- Born: 13 September 1902; Buenos Aires, Argentina
- Died: 15 July 1943 (aged 40); Madrid, Francoist Spain

Isidoro Zorzano Ledesma (13 September 1902 – 15 July 1943) was a Spanish Catholic layman who was a member of Opus Dei.

Zorzano was a naturalized Argentine due to being born in Buenos Aires, though upon his relocating to Spain he met and befriended Fr Josemaría Escrivá and soon joined the latter's embryonic foundation of Opus Dei, which would later become the first personal prelature of the Catholic Church.

Ledesma worked as an engineer and worked in several places though his compassion and love for the poor led people around him to name him as a saint due to his efforts in alleviating their suffering through various means; He aided priests and Opus Dei alike during the Spanish Civil War and he kept to himself for most of that period to avoid being targeted and killed. He died of cancer in 1943.

His cause for sainthood opened under Pope Pius XII on 11 October 1948 and he became titled as a Servant of God while the confirmation of his heroic virtue allowed Pope Francis to title him as Venerable on 21 December 2016.

== Life ==
Isidoro Zorano Ledesma was born on 13 September 1902 in Buenos Aires as the third of five to immigrants who left Spain for economic reasons; a brother that followed after his birth was Francisco and he had two sisters. In 1905 his parents had secured their economic stature and so decided to return to Spain with the intention of returning to Argentina at some stage.

He settled in Logroño where he did his education right through to high school. His father died in 1912 which was unexpected and so his mother decided to remain there. In January 1916 he met Josemaría Escrivá, who was a new classmate that had just arrived from Barbastro and the two became close friends. In 1918 he graduated from high school and began to prepare for an entrance examination into the Special School for Industrial Engineers in Madrid where he relocated in October 1919. In 1924 the collapse of the Spanish bank of Rio de la Plata meant the loss of almost all of the Zorzano's savings and so he and his brother Francisco mulled over stopping their studies to support their mother but she and their sisters wanted them to continue their studies and so Zorzano gave private classes to students to bring in some income. In June 1927 he earned a degree in industrial engineering and he gave classes to prepare students for the entrance exam that he once faced. For a brief time he worked in the shipyards of Matagorda in Cádiz but decided to go to Málaga to work in the Andalusian Railroads Company while still giving private lessons there.

On 24 August 1930 he had a long conversation with his friend Escrivá who was now a priest and the latter described the vision of Opus Dei that he had received in 1928; Zorzano realized it aligned with his spiritual aspirations and enthusiastically joined. He returned to Málaga where his spiritual life deepened: he attended Mass on a more frequent basis and received the Eucharist on a more frequent basis. His love and charitable outreach to the poor never ceased for he spent hours giving classes to poor children in some schools that the Adoration Sisters and the Jesuit priest José Manuel Aicardo managed. Zorano was never critical nor judgmental and never discriminated people based on their political beliefs. His students often recalled that he would provide special classes without charge and he tried to distribute food to those that needed it while giving up for himself what he needed even once fainting in the street as a result.

In June 1936 there were some individuals who told him that certain political groups wanted to kill him due to his faith so he moved to Madrid in an effort to remain safe; this anti-religious sentiment was augmented during the Spanish Civil War that started at this time. He could have fled from the nation but he decided to remain and place his faith in a precarious Buenos Aires birth certificate despite knowing he was in danger regardless of his papers. He bought to Opus Dei bread and wine to celebrate Mass in secret and kept sacred hosts in his room so that those who were in hiding could receive it. Once the war ended he managed to obtain a position in Madrid with the National Railroad Company.

In the beginning of 1943 he was diagnosed with a malignant lymphoma but accepted this terminal prognosis with courage and interpreted it as the will of God and so abandoned himself to this. He died several months later and was interred at the La Almudena cemetery; his remains were reinterred on 6 October 2009 to the church of Saint Albertus Magnus on 9 Benjamin Palencia Street in Madrid in the presence of the Cardinal Archbishop of Madrid Antonio María Rouco Varela.

== Beatification process ==
The beatification process opened in Madrid on 11 October 1948 in an informative process that concluded on 19 April 1961; theologians later collated and investigated his writings while issuing their approval on 21 October 1965 of the fact that such writings adhered to tradition. Another process was later held from 4 December 1993 to 17 June 1994 and it concluded in a Mass that the Auxiliary Bishop Javier Martinez Fernández closed. The Congregation for the Causes of Saints later validated these two previous processes in Rome on 30 September 1994.

On 25 March 2006 the postulation submitted the Positio dossier to the C.C.S. which included four sections. The first section detailed the procedures of the cause thus far (28 pages) as well as a biographical account (149 pages). It also included a critical assessment based on testimonies and other evidence collected (332 pages) and then a conclusion that summed up all the previous aspects of the dossier (613 pages). Theologians issued their approval to the dossier's contents on 17 November 2015 as did the cardinal and bishop members of the C.C.S. on 13 December 2016. The confirmation of his heroic virtue allowed for Pope Francis to title him as Venerable on 21 December 2016.

The current postulator for this cause is Father José Luis Gutiérrez Gómez.

== See also ==
- Opus Dei
