= Álvaro del Portillo =

Spanish Roman Catholic Bishop and Prelate of Opus Dei

Blessed Álvaro del Portillo
- Prelate of the Opus Dei; Titular Bishop of Vita
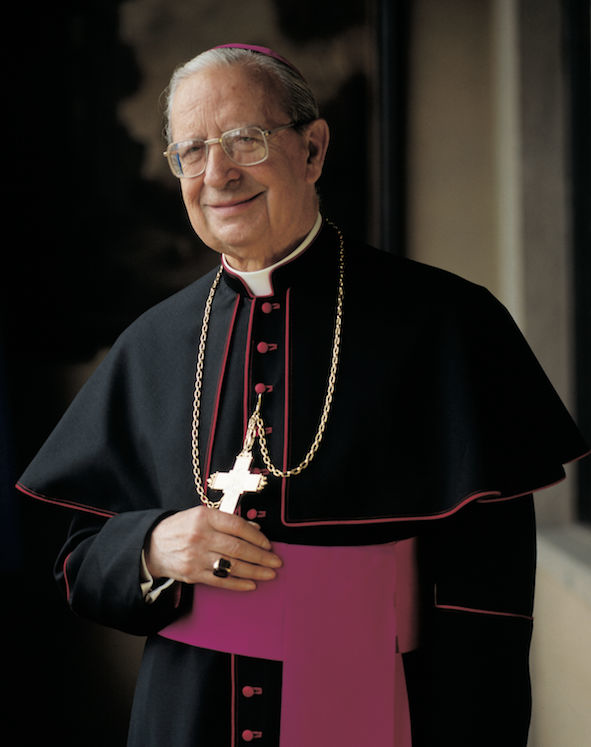
- Álvaro del Portillo
- Native name: Álvaro del Portillo y Diez de Sollano
- Church: Roman Catholic Church
- In office: 1982—1994
- Predecessor: Saint Josemaría Escrivá
- Successor: Javier Echevarría Rodríguez
- Other post: Titular Bishop of Vita (1990-1994)
- Previous post: General President of Opus Dei (1975-1982)

Orders
- Ordination: 25 June 1944 by Leopoldo Eijo y Garay
- Consecration: 6 January 1991 by Pope John Paul II

Personal details
- Born: 11 March 1914 Madrid, Spain
- Died: 23 March 1994 (aged 80) Rome, Italy
- Buried: Church of Santa María de la Paz, Italy
- Motto: Regnare Christum volumus ("We want Christ to Reign!")
- Coat of arms: Álvaro del Portillo's coat of arms

Sainthood
- Feast day: 12 May
- Venerated in: Roman Catholic Church
- Title as Saint: Blessed
- Beatified: 27 September 2014; Madrid, Spain by Cardinal Angelo Amato (on behalf of Pope Francis)

Álvaro del Portillo y Diez de Sollano (11 March 1914 – 23 March 1994) was a Spanish Catholic bishop and engineer who served as the prelate of Opus Dei between 1982 and 1994.

Church leaders Pope John Paul II and Cardinal Carlo Caffarra have praised Portillo as a faithful servant of God. John Paul II referred to him as a "good and faithful servant" while Caffarra dubbed him a "disciple of Christ".

His cause of sainthood commenced on 21 January 2004 after being titled as a Servant of God. The confirmation of his heroic virtue on 28 June 2012 allowed for Pope Benedict XVI to name him as Venerable. He was beatified on 27 September 2014 in Madrid in a Mass that Cardinal Angelo Amato presided over on the behalf of Pope Francis.

== Life ==
Alvaro del Portillo was born in Madrid on 11 March 1914. He was the third of eight children to the devout Ramón del Portillo Pardo and Clementina Diez de Solano Portillo; the couple had married on 11 January 1908. He was baptized on 17 March in the parish of Saint Joseph. He received his Confirmation on 28 December 1916 from the Bishop of Siguenza Eustaquio Nieto y Martín and went on to receive his First Communion on 12 May 1921. He studied civil engineering and after obtaining his doctorate at the University of Madrid taught at its School of Engineering. He briefly worked with the Bureau of Highways and Bridges in the provinces crossed by the rivers Júcar, Duero and Ebro.

In 1935, he joined Opus Dei and was subsequently ordained to the priesthood on June 25, 1944 by Bishop Leopoldo Eijo y Garay of Madrid as one of the first three men ordained for Opus Dei He continued his studies to obtain a doctorate in Philosophy and Letters in history in 1944 from Central University of Madrid, with a dissertation entitled Discoveries and Exploration on the California Coast. In 1948 he earned a Doctorate in Canon Law from the Pontifical University of St. Thomas Aquinas, Angelicum

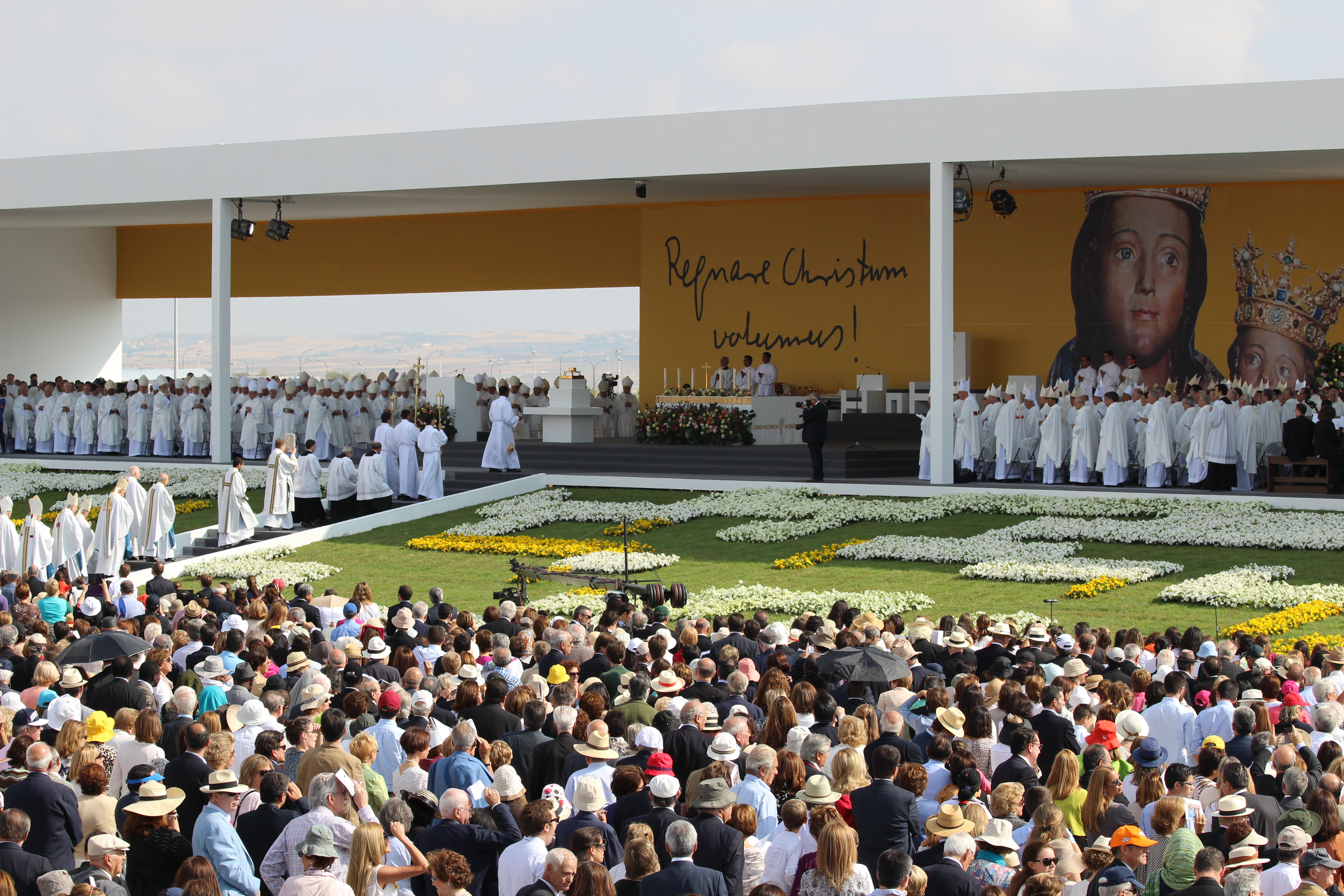
The beatification of del Portillo.

He then dedicated himself exclusively to the ministry and government of Opus Dei as its Secretary General. During the pontificate of Pope Pius XII (1939–1958), he worked in several Dicasteries of the Holy See. Prior to his ordination, he met with that pontiff in a private audience on 4 June 1943 and met with Giovanni Battista Montini (the future Pope Paul VI) on the following 17 June.

In 1963, he was named by Pope John XXIII as a consultant on the Pontifical Commission for the revision of the Code of Canon Law. Pope Paul VI named him consultant on several post-Conciliar commissions. In 1975, he was chosen president general of Opus Dei and successor of Josemaría Escrivá de Balaguer, and in 1982, the Holy See appointed him as the first Prelate of Opus Dei. In 1991, he was consecrated a bishop by Pope John Paul II, with Archbishops Giovanni Battista Re and Justin Francis Rigali serving as co-consecrators. That same year, he attended World Youth Day in Częstochowa.

He has written extensively about pastoral and ecclesiological matters that examine among others, the role of the lay faithful in the Roman Catholic Church, the human side of priestly formation, the dynamics and functionality of pastoral structures. As Prelate, he also served as Grand Chancellor of the University of Piura in Peru.

Shortly after his 80th birthday, he returned to Rome on a pilgrimage from the Holy Land. He died shortly thereafter. He had celebrated his last Mass at the Church of the Cenacle. Later that day, Pope John Paul II came to pray before del Portillo's remains, which now lie in the crypt of the Church of the Prelature, Our Lady of Peace at Bruno Buozzi 75, Rome.

== Contribution to the Second Vatican Council ==
The history of del Portillo's involvement is as follows:

- May 2, 1959: named Consultor of the congregation of the Council;
- August 10, 1959: named President of the VII internal Commission De laicatu catholico;
- Named member of the pre-preparatory Commission on the states of perfection;
- August 12 elected member of the III Commission of the Congregation of the Council encharged to study the so-called peculiaria nostrae aetatis apostolatus media.
- October 4, 1962: named conciliar "Peritus."
- November 4, 1962: named "Peritus" of the Commission for the Discipline of the Clergy and Christian People;
- November 8, 1962: named Secretary of this organism
- Named Consultor of the Commissions for the Bishops and the regime of the dioceses, the Religious and the Discipline of the Faith.
- September 29 – December 1963: during the Second Session of the Council, the Commission for the Discipline of the Clergy and the Christian People, of which D. Alvaro was Secretary, was charged to synthesize into a single conciliar decree (to become "Presbyterorum Ordinis). He coordinated the work of the members of the Commission which became a conciliar text of a single chapter subdivided into 10 parts.

According to Salvador Bernal, his biographer: Del Portillo was the person who argued that there be a specific Decree for priests. Also one of the decisions of the Commission for the Discipline of the Clergy and the Christian People was "defend centuries-old traditions against those who regarded them as mere pietism. It discussed the presence of the priest in the world, and why he needed a good formation in the basic human virtues in order to serve the men and women of his time. But it also warned that priests should not adopt lay lifestyles, much less take on commitments of a partisan political nature. Finally, it asserted the freedom to join associations which in one way or another could help them achieve personal sanctification in the carrying out of their priestly ministry."

"Not a week had gone by after the close of the Council when Cardinal Ciriaci, president of the commission of which Don Alvaro had been secretary, sent him a note expressing heartfelt gratitude and congratulations for the happy conclusion of a great achievement." The note said: "You steered to a safe harbor your decree, which is by no means the least important of the decrees and constitutions of the Council." The vote on the document was 2390 to 4, a nearly unanimous approval after thorough debate, on December 7, 1965. Ciriaci said: (History would regard this decree as) "a fresh, and practically unanimous, confirmation by the Second Vatican Council of ecclesiastical celibacy and the exalted mission of the priesthood."

Pope Paul VI also commented on his work: "I am well aware of the extent to which this is a result of your prudent, tenacious, and courteous efforts. Without failing to respect the freedom of others to have and to express their own opinions, you never swerved from the track of fidelity to the great principles of priestly spirituality."

== Veneration ==
=== Process ===
On his death, John Paul II recalled del Portillo's "zealous priestly and episcopal life, the example he always gave of fortitude and of trust in divine providence and his fidelity to the See of Peter."

The then Cardinal Joseph Ratzinger referred to del Portillo's "modesty and availability in every circumstance," in his work at the Congregation for the Doctrine of the Faith, which del Portillo "enriched in a singular way with his competence and experience."

On December 6, 2002, Javier Echevarria Rodriguez ordered an investigation into the cause for canonization of del Portillo.

In 2004, the Cardinal Vicar of Rome, Camillo Ruini, said "The rather frequent occasions that I had to meet Bishop del Portillo imprinted on my soul the conviction that I found myself in the presence of an exemplary pastor." He added: "In the firmness of his adherence to the doctrine of the Church, in his union with the Pope, in his pastoral charity, in his humility, and in his balance, he exhibited an extraordinary interior richness." According to the Cardinal, "the service that Don Alvaro always provided to the Church of Rome and the prompt and effective way that he supported the Holy Father's pastoral initiatives in this diocese showed the love of the Church that he had learned from St. Josemaría."

Ruini said that there is a desire for a "quick beginning of this cause of canonization" on the part of "so many members of the ecclesiastical hierarchy and of the people of God." Also that there is "an abundant store of testimonies of people who knew him, among them, those of quite a few cardinals and bishops," he said. He then added: "The Bishop's Conference [of Italy] has unanimously expressed its favorable opinion" on beginning the cause.

For the process, 133 witnesses were interviewed. Among them were 19 cardinals and 12 bishops or archbishops. 62 of the witnesses belong to the Prelature; 71 do not belong to it. The documentation submitted to the Vatican comprised 2,530 pages in three volumes.

=== Venerable ===
On June 28, 2012 — as approved by Pope Benedict XVI — the Vatican announced that his life had been recognized as one of "heroic virtue", a major step towards an eventual beatification. From this time on, del Portillo was styled "Venerable Servant of God".

=== Beatification ===
On July 5, 2013 Pope Francis published a decree from the Congregation for the Causes of the Saints declaring the miraculous character of a cure of a Chilean boy attributed to the intercession of the del Portillo. Del Portillo was beatified on September 27, 2014 in his birth city of Madrid by Cardinal Angelo Amato, prefect of the Congregation for the Causes of the Saints. May 12 was appointed as his feast day. The former Prefect of the Congregation for the Causes of Saints, Cardinal Angelo Amato, described his holiness as part of the transformation of the world.

== Works ==
- Descubrimientos y exploraciones en las costas de California, 1532-1650 ("Discoveries and explorations off the coast of California, 1532-1650") (1944, doctoral thesis)
- Faithful and Laity in the Church (1969)
- On the Priesthood (1970)
- Dinamicità e funzionalità delle strutture pastorali ("Dynamism and functionality of pastoral structures")
- ¿Un nuevo Derecho Canónico? ("A new canon law?")
- Morale e Diritto ("Morality and law")
- Immersed in God: Blessed Josemaria Escriva, Founder of Opus Dei as Seen by His Successor, Bishop Álvaro Del Portillo—by Álvaro Del Portillo and Cesare Cavalleri
- Journey with Jesus through the Liturgical Year
- Orar: Como sal y como luz ("Praying: like salt and like light")

=== Excerpts from his works ===
"Authentic joy is based on this foundation: that we want to live for God and want to serve others because of God. Let us tell the Lord that we want nothing more than to serve him with joy. If we behave in this way we shall find that our inner peace, our joy, our good humour will attract many souls to God. Give witness to Christian joy. Show to those around you that this is our great secret. We are happy because we are children of God, because we deal with him, because we struggle to become better for him. And when we fail, we go right away to the Sacrament of joy where we recover our sense of fraternity with all men and women." Homily, 12 Apr 1984; quoted by Francis Fernandez Carvajal in In Conversation With God, vol.5, p. 155

== Bibliography ==
=== Works by Blessed Álvaro del Portillo ===
- Álvaro del Portillo (1947), Descubrimientos y exploraciones en las costas de California, Madrid, [Publicaciones de la Escuela de Estudios Hispano-Americanos], 1ª, 540 pp.
- Álvaro del Portillo (1969), Fieles y laicos en la Iglesia: Bases de sus respectivos estatutos jurídicos, Pamplona, Eunsa, 1ª, 317 pp.
- Álvaro del Portillo (1970), Escritos sobre el sacerdocio, Madrid, Palabra, 1ª, 156 pp. ISBN 9788471187215
- Álvaro del Portillo (1981), Fieles y laicos en la Iglesia: Bases de sus respectivos estatutos jurídicos, Pamplona, Eunsa, 2ª ed. revisada, 261 pp. ISBN 8431301309
- Álvaro del Portillo (1982), Descubrimientos y exploraciones en las costas de California 1532-1650, Madrid, Rialp, 2ª ed. aum., 535 pp. ISBN 9788432121890
- Álvaro del Portillo y Josemaría Escrivá de Balaguer (1986), Amar a la Iglesia, Madrid, Palabra, 1986, 1ª, 128 pp. ISBN 8471184427
- Álvaro del Portillo (1991), Escritos sobre el sacerdocio, Madrid, Palabra, 6ª ed. aumentada, 207 pp.
- Álvaro del Portillo (1992), Una vida para Dios: Reflexiones en torno a la figura de Monseñor Josemaría Escrivá de Balaguer, Madrid, Rialp, 1ª, 299 pp. ISBN 9788432128639
- Álvaro del Portillo y Cesare Cavalleri (1993), Entrevista sobre el fundador del Opus Dei, Madrid, Rialp, 1ª, 252 pp.
- Álvaro del Portillo (1995), Rendere amabile la verità: raccolta di scritti di Mons. Alvaro del Portillo: pastorali, teologici, canonistici, vari, Città del Vaticano, Libreria Editrice Vaticana, 1995, 1ª, 692 pp. ISBN 8820920549
- Álvaro del Portillo (2013), Orar: como sal y como luz. Selección de textos sobre la vida cristiana. Edición a cargo de José Antonio Loarte, Barcelona, Planeta, 2013, 1ª, 252 pp. ISBN 9788408113805
- Álvaro del Portillo (2013), Rezar con Álvaro del Portillo: textos para meditar. Selección de José Antonio Loarte, Alicante, Cobel, 2014, 1ª, 111 pp. ISBN 9788493752583
- Álvaro del Portillo, Beato (2014), Caminar con Jesús al compás del año litúrgico. Textos tomados de las cartas pastorales. Selección de José Antonio Loarte, Madrid, Ediciones Cristiandad, 2014, 1ª, 290 pp. ISBN 9788470575969
- Álvaro del Portillo (2014), Faithful and Laity in the Church: The Bases of their Juridical Status, Canada, Wilson & Lafleur, 2nd English Ed, 284 pp. ISBN 978-2-89689-061-3

=== Bibliography on Blessed Álvaro del Portillo ===
- AA.VV. (2014), Beatificación Álvaro del Portillo: Madrid, 27 de septiembre de 2014, Madrid, Rialp, 1ª, 140 pp. ISBN 9788432144233
- Azevedo, Hugo de (2012), Misión cumplida: Mons. Álvaro del Portillo, Madrid, Palabra, 1ª ed. castellana, 301 pp. ISBN 9788498406399
- Bernal, Salvador (1996), Recuerdo de Álvaro del Portillo, prelado del Opus Dei, Madrid, Rialp, 1ª, 296 pp. ISBN 9788432131264
- Bernal, Salvador (2012), Álvaro del Portillo: una semblanza personal, Pamplona, Eunsa, 2012, 1ª, 130 pp.
- Catret Mascarell, Amparo y Sánchez Marchori, Mar (1999), Se llamaba Álvaro. Vida de Monseñor Alvaro del Portillo, Madrid, Palabra, 1ª, 31 pp. ISBN 8482393952
- Catret Mascarell, Amparo y Sánchez Marchori, Mar (2010), Se llamaba Álvaro. Un hombre fiel, Madrid, Palabra, 3ª, 31 pp. ISBN 9788498403626
- Cejas Arroyo, José Miguel (2014), Álvaro del Portillo: Al servicio de la Iglesia, Madrid, San Pablo, 1ª, 159 pp. ISBN 9788428545549
- Coma, María Jesús (2018), Forjar la sombra: Álvaro del Portillo en la Época de Burgos, Alicante, Cobel Ediciones, 1ª, 194 pp. ISBN 9788494694660
- Coverdale, John F. (2014), Saxum: vida de Álvaro del Portillo, Madrid, Palabra, 1ª ed. castellana, 316 pp. ISBN 9788490610787
- Ducay Vela, Antonio (2014), Álvaro del Portillo sembrador de paz y de alegría, Lima, Centro de Estudios y Comunicación (CDSCO), 1ª, 308 pp. ISBN 9786124674303
- Medina Bayo, Javier (2012), Álvaro del Portillo. Un hombre fiel, Madrid, Rialp, 1ª, 826 pp. ISBN 9788432142192
- Russo, Francesco (2020), In ogni circostanza. L'intercessione del Beato Álvaro del Portillo, Torino, Elledici, 96 pp. ISBN 9788801066753
- Scott, Helena y Tolansky, Ethel (2014), Álvaro del Portillo: el poder de la humildad. Prelado del Opus Dei 1914-1994, Madrid, Palabra, 1ª ed. castellana, 92 pp. ISBN 9788490610367

=== Articles and Essays ===
- AA.VV. (1995) "Profilo biografico di mons. Alvaro del Portillo y Diez de Sollano", en Ateneo Romano de la Santa Cruz, Rendere amabile la verità: raccolta di scritti di Mons. Alvaro del Portillo, pastorali, teologici, canonistici, vari, Città del Vaticano, Libreria Editrice Vaticana, pp. 661–664. ISBN 9788820920548
- Badrinas Amat, Benito (2003), "Álvaro del Portillo y Diez de Sollano: la vida junto a un santo", en Paulino Castañeda Delgado y Manuel J. Cociña y Abella (eds.),Testigos del siglo XX, Maestros del XXI. Actas del XIII Simposio de Historia de la Iglesia en España y América, Sevilla, 8 de abril de 2002, Córdoba, Publicaciones Obra Social y Cultural CajaSur, pp. 383–394. ISBN 8479595094
- Fernández Montes, J. Mario; Martínez Sánchez, Santiago; y González Gullón, José Luis, "Bibliografía general sobre los prelados del Opus Dei: Álvaro del Portillo", Studia et Documenta: Rivista dell'Istituto Storico san Josemaría Escrivá, vol. VI, núm. 6 (2012), pp. 469–515.
- Fernández Montes, J. Mario y Martínez Sánchez, Santiago, "Bibliografía general sobre los Prelados del Opus Dei: Álvaro del Portillo y Javier Echevarría, 2003-2009", Studia et Documenta: Rivista dell'Istituto Storico san Josemaría Escrivá, vol. X, núm. 10 (2016), pp. 501–545.
- Fernández Montes, José Mario y Martínez Sánchez, Santiago, "Bibliografía general sobre los Prelados del Opus Dei: Álvaro del Portillo y Javier Echevarría, 2010-2013", Studia et Documenta: Rivista dell'Istituto Storico san Josemaría Escrivá, vol. XIII, núm. 13 (2019), pp. 483–511.

== Sources ==
- Postulator Speaks about Alvaro del Portillo's Cause of Canonization
- Bernal, Salvador (August 1999). Álvaro del Portillo. Scepter Publishers. ISBN 1-889334-18-9
- Spanish biography of Msgr. del Portillo
- Anniversary of the death of Alvaro del Portillo by Robert O'Connor
- Amadeo de Fuenmayor Champín and Manuel J. Peláez, "Álvaro [José María Eulogio] del Portillo Diez de Sollano (1914-1994)", in Diccionario crítico de Juristas españoles, portugueses y latinoamericanos (hispánicos, brasileños, quebequenses y restantes francófonos) [until November 2006], vol. II, part 1 (M-Va), Zaragoza-Barcelona, 2006, pp. 335–339, no. 818.
- María del Carmen Amaya Galván, extended and updated English version of Álvaro del Portillo's biography as a canonist, written by A. de Fuenmayor and Manuel J. Peláez, in María del Carmen Amaya Galván and M. J. Peláez, "Informes jurídicos y notas políticas sobre la situación política y jurídica de Andorra remitidos al Prefecto de los Pirineos Orientales (1881-1965) por el Ministerio de Asuntos Exteriores galo, por el Comisario extraordinario para los Valles de Andorra René Baulard (1933 y 1936-1940) y por otras autoridades y personalidades políticas y académicas (tercera parte)", in Contribuciones a las Ciencias Sociales, ISSN 1988-7833, October 2010, online, http://www.eumed.net/rev/cccss/10/pag.htm (pp. 1–76), see .Pdf file, pp. 5–9, notes 9 and 10 [It has been indexed as an extended abstract in EconPapers (Örebro University – Swedish Business School. Sweden), in Ideas in Society of Economic Dynamics (University of Connecticut. U.S.A.), and in Соционет, научное информационное пространство (Moscow. Russia)].
- Cardinal Angelo Amato, Come la santità trasforma il mondo. Article published in italian, in L'osservatore romano on April 29, 2021.

Catholic Church titles
| New title | Prelate of Opus Dei; 28 November 1982 – 23 March 1994 | Succeeded by Javier Echevarría Rodríguez |
| Preceded by Francisco Orozco Lomelín | — TITULAR — Bishop of Vita; 7 December 1990 – 23 March 1994 | Succeeded by Pablo Cedano Cedano |
