= Opus Dei =

Personal prelature of the Catholic Church

- Seal of the Holy Cross and Opus Dei
- Formation: 2 October 1928; 98 years ago
- Founder: Josemaría Escrivá
- Type: Personal prelature
- Purpose: Spreading the universal call to holiness in ordinary life
- Headquarters: Viale Bruno Buozzi, 73, 00197 Rome, Italy
- Coordinates: 41.9218°N 12.4841°E
- Region served: Worldwide
- Members: 85,000 (2025)
- Prelate: Fernando Ocáriz Braña
- Main organ: General Council; Central Advisory
- Parent organization: Catholic Church
- Website: opusdei.org

Opus Dei (Latin for 'Work of God') is a personal prelature of the Catholic Church founded in Spain on 2 October 1928 by Josemaría Escrivá. The prelature states that it helps lay and clerical members pursue holiness through everyday occupations and social responsibilities. The Holy See granted final approval in 1950 under Pope Pius XII. In 1982 Pope John Paul II affirmed its status as a personal prelature through the apostolic constitution Ut sit. While the organization remains controversial, Catholic Church leaders have voiced support.

Laypeople constitute most members of Opus Dei, and the rest are secular priests governed by a prelate elected by specific members and appointed by the Pope. Because Opus Dei is Latin for 'Work of God', members and supporters often refer to the prelature as "the Work". Beyond personal charity and social services, the prelature organizes training in Catholic spirituality applied to daily life. Opus Dei members are located in more than 90 countries. About 70% of members live in their own homes and maintain secular careers while taking part in prelature activities, while the remaining are celibate, of whom the majority live in Opus Dei centers.

== History ==
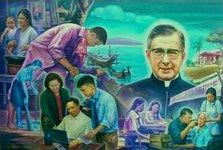
Escrivá surrounded by working people, in a Filipino painting entitled Magpakabanal sa Gawain or "Be holy through your work"

=== Foundational period ===
Opus Dei was founded by Josemaría Escrivá on 2 October 1928 in Madrid, Spain. According to Escrivá, on that day he experienced a vision in which he "saw Opus Dei". He gave the organization the name "Opus Dei", which in Latin means 'Work of God', in order to underscore the belief that the organization was not his (Escrivá's) work, but was rather God's work. Throughout his life, Escrivá held that the founding of Opus Dei had a supernatural character. Escrivá summarized Opus Dei's mission as a way of helping ordinary Christians "to understand that their life ... is a way of holiness and evangelization ... And to those who grasp this ideal of holiness, the Work offers the spiritual assistance and training they need to put it into practice."

Initially, Opus Dei was open only to men, but in 1930, Escrivá started to admit women, based on what he believed to be a communication from God. Persecuted during the Spanish Civil War and narrowly escaping death several times, in 1939 Escrivá was able to return to Madrid after three years of hiding. In 1939, Escrivá published The Way, a collection of 999 maxims concerning spirituality for people involved in secular affairs.

Opus Dei rapidly grew during the years of Francoist Spain, spreading first throughout Spain, and after 1945, expanding internationally. Escrivá had to overcome many obstacles. He later recounted that it was in Spain where Opus Dei found "the greatest difficulties" because of "enemies of personal freedom", and traditionalists who he felt misunderstood Opus Dei's ideas. Critics underline that several Opus Dei members were appointed ministers in General Francisco Franco's government. They say that this is evidence of the organization's penetration into the highest echelons of Spain's Fascist regime. Others note the origins of Opus Dei itself and the decision of its founder, Escrivá de Balaguer, to flee first to France during the Spanish Civil War and then to join the insurgent generals in Burgos, then capital for the rebels seeking to overthrow Spain's democratically elected leftist government. It is worth noting that Opus Dei's first offices in Madrid were in the same building as the Ministry of the Interior.

In 1947, a year after Escrivá moved the organization's headquarters to Rome, Opus Dei received a decree of praise and approval from Pope Pius XII, making it an institute of "pontifical right", i.e. under the direct governance of the Pope. In 1950, Pius XII granted definitive approval to Opus Dei, thereby allowing married people to join the organization, and secular clergy to be admitted to the Priestly Society of the Holy Cross. Several Opus Dei members such as Alberto Ullastres were ministers under the dictator Francisco Franco in Spain.

=== Post-foundational years ===
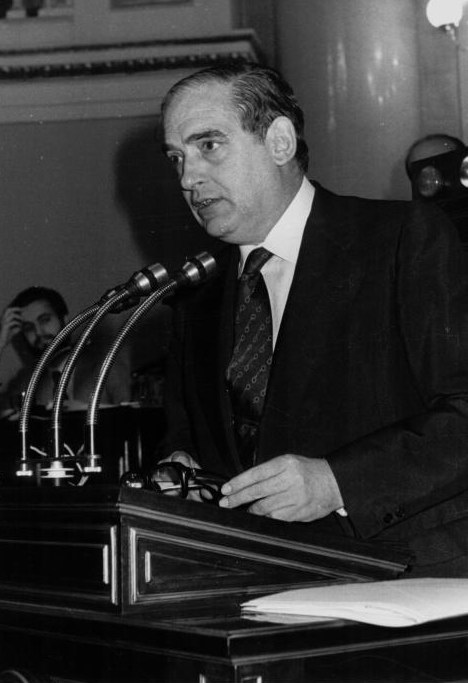
Antonio Fontán, Spanish journalist and Opus Dei member who fought for press freedom and democracy under Franco and was repeatedly persecuted by the regime. Fontan later became the first Senate President of Spain's democracy.

==== Designation as personal prelature ====
In 1975, Escrivá died and was succeeded by Álvaro del Portillo. In 1982, Opus Dei was made into a personal prelature. This means that Opus Dei is part of the Catholic Church, and the spirituality of the members falls under the direct jurisdiction of the prelate of Opus Dei wherever they are. As to "what the law lays down for all the ordinary faithful", the lay members of Opus Dei, being no different from other Catholics, "continue to be ... under the jurisdiction of the diocesan bishop", in the words of John Paul II's Apostolic Constitution, Ut Sit.

==== Canonization of Escrivá ====
One-third of the world's bishops sent letters petitioning for the canonization of Escrivá. Escrivá was beatified in 1992 in the midst of controversy prompted by questions about his suitability for sainthood. In 2002, approximately 300,000 people gathered in St. Peter's Square on the day Pope John Paul II canonized him. There are other members whose process of beatification has been opened: Ernesto Cofiño, a father of five children and a pioneer in pediatric research in Guatemala; Montserrat Grases, a teenage Catalan student who died of cancer; Toni Zweifel, a Swiss engineer; Tomás Alvira and wife, Paquita Domínguez, a Spanish married couple; Isidoro Zorzano Ledesma, an Argentinian engineer; Dora del Hoyo, a domestic worker; Fr. José María Hernández Garnica; and Father José Luis Múzquiz de Miguel, a Spanish priest who began Opus Dei in the United States.

==== Beatifications and controversies in 2000s–2010s ====
During the pontificate of John Paul II, two members of Opus Dei, Juan Luis Cipriani Thorne and Julián Herranz Casado, were made cardinals. In September 2005, Pope Benedict XVI blessed a newly installed statue of Josemaría Escrivá placed in an outside wall niche of St Peter's Basilica, a place for founders of Catholic organizations. During that same year, Opus Dei received attention due to the success of the novel The Da Vinci Code, in which both Opus Dei and the Catholic Church itself work against the protagonists. The film version was released globally in May 2006, further polarizing views on the organization.

In 2014, Pope Francis through a delegate beatified Álvaro del Portillo and said that "he teaches us that in the simplicity and ordinariness of our life we can find a sure path to holiness". At the end of 2014, the prelature has spread to 69 countries, while its members are present in 90 countries. Javier Echevarría Rodríguez, the second prelate of Opus Dei, died on 12 December 2016, and was succeeded by Fernando Ocáriz. He was elected the new prelate of Opus Dei on 23 January 2017, and on the same day was appointed by Pope Francis as such.

In 2019, Guadalupe Ortiz de Landázuri, one of the first women who joined Opus Dei, was beatified in Madrid, Spain. She is the first woman of the group to be beatified. Earlier in 2005, the first publicly-known sexual abuse case of Opus Dei in the US, against C. John McCloskey, was settled for $977,000. Opus Dei publicly acknowledged a sexual abuse case within the organisation for the first time in its history in July 2020, this one involving priest Manuel Cociña in Spain.

==== Pope Francis: "Safeguard the charism" ====
On 22 July 2022, Pope Francis issued the apostolic letter in the form of a motu proprio Ad charisma tuendum, which seeks to "safeguard the charism", or original foundational spirit; it is "intended to confirm the Prelature of Opus Dei in the authentically charismatic sphere of the Church, specifying its organization in keeping with the witness of the Founder." Among other things, the new disposition decrees that the head of the Opus Dei can no longer become a bishop, but "is granted, by reason of his office, the use of the title of Supernumerary Apostolic Protonotary with the title of Reverend Monsignor and therefore may use the insignia [including heraldic devices] corresponding to this title". It also transfers responsibility for the personal prelature Opus Dei from the Dicastery for Bishops to the Dicastery for the Clergy, conforming to the apostolic constitution Praedicate evangelium, and mandates revision of the statutes of the personal prelature to bring them into conformity with these reforms. This reform became effective on 4 August 2022, and Pope Francis explained that this action was carried out in consultation with canon lawyers of Opus Dei and had no negative connotation for he has very positive sentiments for Opus Dei. On 8 August 2023, Pope Francis issued a new motu proprio which stated that personal prelatures such as Opus Dei, are "similar to public clerical associations of pontifical law", such as the Community of Saint Martin and the Family of Mary, while not being identified with them.

== Spirituality ==
=== Doctrine ===
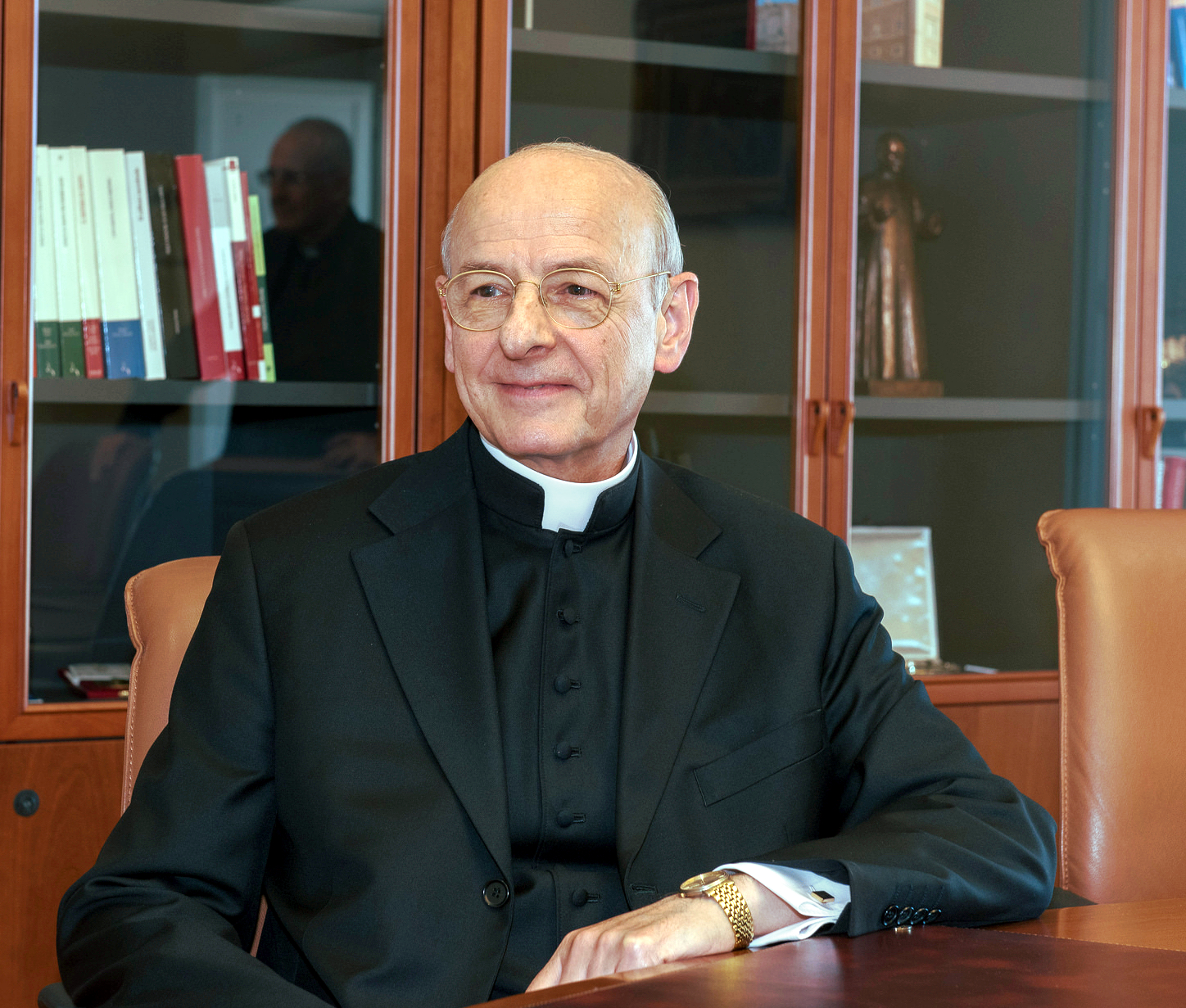
Fernando Ocariz, present prelate of Opus Dei

Opus Dei places emphasis on certain aspects of Catholic doctrine. A central point of focus in Opus Dei's theology is the lives of the Catholic laypeople. Opus Dei emphasizes the "universal call to holiness": the belief that everyone should aspire to be a saint, as per Jesus' commandment to "Love God with all your heart" (Matthew 22:37) and "Be perfect as your heavenly Father is perfect." (Matthew 5:48) Opus Dei also teaches that sanctity is within the reach of everyone, given Jesus' teaching that his demands are "easy" and "light," as his divine assistance is assured.

Opus Dei does not have monks or nuns; only a minority of its members are priests. Opus Dei emphasizes uniting spiritual life with professional, social, and family life. Members of Opus Dei lead ordinary lives, with traditional families and secular careers, and strive to "sanctify ordinary life". Pope John Paul II called Escrivá "the saint of ordinary life". Similarly, Opus Dei stresses the importance of work and professional competence. Opus Dei exhorts its members and all lay Catholics to "find God in daily life" and to perform their work as a service to society and as an offering to God. Opus Dei teaches that work not only contributes to social progress but is a "path to holiness".

The biblical roots of this Catholic doctrine, according to the founder, are in the phrase "God created man to work" (Genesis 2:15) and Jesus' time as a carpenter in a small town. Escrivá also points to the gospel account that Jesus "has done everything well" (Mark 7:37). The foundation of the Christian life, as stressed by Escrivá, is divine filiation: Christians are children of God, identified with Christ's life and mission. Other main ideals of Opus Dei, according to its official literature, are freedom, respecting choice, taking personal responsibility, charity, and love of God above all and love of others.

At the bottom of Escrivá's understanding of the "universal call to holiness" are two dimensions, subjective and objective, according to Fernando Ocariz, a Catholic theologian and prelate of Opus Dei since 2017. The subjective is the call given to each person to become a saint, regardless of their place in society. The objective refers to what Escrivá calls Christian materialism: all of creation, even the most material situation, is a meeting place with God, and leads to union with him.

=== Prayers ===
All members – whether married or unmarried, priests or laypeople – are trained to follow a 'plan of life', or 'the norms of piety', which are traditional Catholic devotions. This is in order to follow the teaching of the Catholic Catechism: "pray at specific times...to nourish continual prayer".

=== Mortification ===
Public attention has focused on Opus Dei's practice of mortification of the flesh. Examples include fasting and remaining silent for certain hours during the day when this is compatible with family and professional duties. Opus Dei faithful also use the cilice and the discipline for mortification of the flesh. Mortification has a long history in many world religions, including the Catholic Church. Popes have endorsed it as a way of 'following Christ', who died of crucifixion and who, speaking of anybody that sought to be his disciple, said: "let him deny himself, take up his cross daily and follow me" (Luke 9:23).

== Organization and activities ==
=== Governance ===
In Pope John Paul II's 1982 decree known as the Apostolic constitution Ut Sit, Opus Dei was established as a personal prelature, an official structure of the Catholic Church, similar to a diocese in that it contains lay people and secular priests led by a bishop. However, whereas a bishop normally has a territory or diocese, the prelate of Opus Dei is pastor to the members and priests of Opus Dei worldwide, no matter what diocese they are in. Opus Dei is the only personal prelature in existence. In addition to being governed by Ut Sit and by the Catholic Church's general law, Opus Dei is governed by the church's Particular Law concerning Opus Dei, otherwise known as Opus Dei's statutes. This specifies the objectives and workings of the prelature. The prelature is under the Dicastery for the Clergy.

Opus Dei's highest assembled bodies are the General Congresses, which are convened once every eight years. There are separate congresses for the men's and women's branches of Opus Dei. The General Congresses are made up of members appointed by the prelate and are responsible for advising him about the prelature's future. The men's General Congress also elects the prelate from a list of candidates chosen by their female counterparts. After the death of a prelate, a special elective General Congress is convened. The women nominate their preferred candidates for the prelate and is voted upon by the men to become the next prelate—an appointment that must be confirmed by the Pope.

The head of the Opus Dei prelature is known as the prelate. The prelate is the primary governing authority and is assisted by two councils—the General Council (made up of men) and the Central Advisory (made up of women). The prelate holds his position for life. The current prelate of Opus Dei is Fernando Ocáriz Braña, who became the third prelate of Opus Dei on 23 January 2017. The first prelate of Opus Dei was Álvaro del Portillo, who held the position from 1982 until his death in 1994.

=== Membership ===
As of 2018, the faithful of the Opus Dei Prelature numbered 95,318 members, of which 93,203 are lay persons, men and women, and 2,115 priests. These figures do not include the priest members of Opus Dei's Priestly Society of the Holy Cross, estimated to number 2,000 in the year 2005. About 60 percent of Opus Dei faithful reside in Europe, and 35 percent reside in the Americas. Women comprise 57% of the total membership. According to Vittorio Messori in 1997, for the most part, Opus Dei faithful belong to the middle to low levels in society in terms of education, income, and social status. Peter L. Berger and Samuel Huntington described Opus Dei in 2002 as "militantly conservative in its theology and morality but very positive in its attitude to modern global capitalism", influential in Latin America and the Philippines.

Opus Dei is made up of several different types of faithful. According to the Statutes of Opus Dei, the distinction derives from the degree to which they make themselves available for the official activities of the Prelature and for giving formation according to the spirit of Opus Dei.

==== Supernumeraries ====
Supernumeraries, the largest type, currently account for about 70% of the total membership. Typically, supernumeraries are married men and women with careers. Supernumeraries devote a portion of their day to prayer, in addition to attending regular meetings and taking part in activities such as retreats. Due to their career and family obligations, supernumeraries are not as available to the organization as the other types of faithful, but typically contribute financially and lend other types of assistance as their circumstances permit.

==== Numeraries ====
Numeraries, the second largest type of the faithful of Opus Dei, comprise about 20% of the total membership. "Numerary" is a general term for persons who form part of the permanent staff of an organization. In Opus Dei, numeraries are celibate members who give themselves in "full availability" (plena disponibilitas) for the official undertakings of the Prelature. A study comparing Scientology and Opus Dei found some similarities as well as strong differences. This includes full availability for giving doctrinal and ascetical formation to other members, for staffing the internal government of Opus Dei if asked by the regional directors, and for moving to other countries to start or help with apostolic activities if asked by the prelate. Numeraries are expected to live in gender-specific centers run by Opus Dei, and the question of which particular center a numerary will live in depends upon the regional needs. It is considered very important for numeraries to participate in daily meals and "get-togethers" in which the sharing of news and conversation takes place. Numeraries generally have jobs outside of Opus Dei, although some are asked to work internally full-time, and thus change their professional goals in order to be available for the Prelature. The majority of numerary income is contributed to the organization.

==== Numerary assistants ====
Numerary assistants are a type of numerary that exists in the Women's Branch of Opus Dei. They are responsible for the "domestic tasks in the Centres of Opus Dei, which they willingly undertake as their professional work." Associates are celibate faithful who take on one or more apostolic assignment(s) from the Prelature in giving doctrinal and ascetical formation and/or coordinating activities. They differ from numeraries in not making themselves "fully" available to staff the official undertakings of the Prelature, instead giving themselves in additional social realities, such as through their profession or to their own families. Because of this difference in availability for the official activities of Opus Dei, unlike numeraries the associates do not live in Opus Dei centers but maintain their own abodes. The Clergy of the Opus Dei Prelature are priests who are under the jurisdiction of the prelate of Opus Dei. They are a minority in Opus Dei that makes up about 2% of Opus Dei members.

==== Priests ====
The Priestly Society of the Holy Cross consists of priests associated with Opus Dei. Part of the society is made up of the clergy of the Opus Dei prelature—priests who fall under the jurisdiction of the Opus Dei prelature are automatically members of the Priestly Society. Other members in the society are diocesan priests—clergymen who remain under the jurisdiction of a geographically defined diocese. These priests are considered full members of Opus Dei who are given its spiritual training. They do not, however, report to the Opus Dei prelate but to their own diocesan bishop. As of 2005, there were roughly two thousand of these priests.

==== Cooperators ====
The Cooperators of Opus Dei are non-members who collaborate in some way with Opus Dei—usually through praying, charitable contributions, or by providing some other assistance. Cooperators are not required to be celibate or to adhere to any other special requirements, and are not even required to be Christian. There were 164,000 cooperators in the year 2005. In accordance with Catholic theology, membership is granted when a vocation or divine calling is presumed to have occurred.

=== Activities ===
Arnold Hall Conference Center in Massachusetts

Leaders of Opus Dei describe the organization as a teaching entity whose main activity is to train Catholics to assume personal responsibility in sanctifying the secular world from within. This teaching is done by means of theory and practice.

Its lay people and priests organize seminars, workshops, retreats, and classes to help people put the Christian faith into practice in their daily lives. Spiritual direction, one-on-one coaching with a more experienced lay person or priest, is considered the "paramount means" of training. Through these activities, they provide religious instruction (doctrinal formation), coaching in spirituality for lay people (spiritual formation), character and moral education (human formation), lessons in sanctifying one's work (professional formation), and know-how in evangelizing one's family, workplace, society and public life (apostolic formation).

The official Catholic document, which established the prelature, states that Opus Dei strives "to put into practice the teaching of the universal call to sanctity, and to promote at all levels of society the sanctification of ordinary work, and by means of ordinary work." Thus, the founder and his followers describe members of Opus Dei as resembling the members of the early Christian Church—ordinary workers who seriously sought holiness with nothing exterior to distinguish them from other citizens.

Opus Dei runs residential centers throughout the world. These centers provide residential housing for celibate members and provide doctrinal and theological education.

==== Corporate works ====
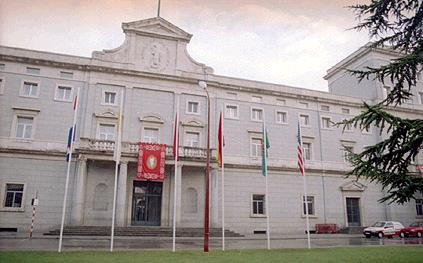
Central building of the University of Navarra

Opus Dei is responsible for a variety of non-profit institutions called corporate works of Opus Dei. The total assets of non-profits connected to Opus Dei are worth at least $2.8 billion.

A study of the year 2005 showed that members have cooperated with other people in setting up a total of 608 social initiatives: schools and university residences (68%), technical or agricultural training centers (26%), universities, business schools, and hospitals (6%). The University of Navarra in Pamplona, Spain, and the Austral University in Buenos Aires, Argentina, are both examples of the corporate work of Opus Dei. These universities usually perform very high in international rankings. IESE, the University of Navarra's Business School, was adjudged one of the best in the world by the Financial Times and the Economist Intelligence Unit.

Other universities affiliated with Opus Dei include the Pontifical University of the Holy Cross and Università Campus Bio-Medico di Roma in Rome, Strathmore University in Kenya, University of Montevideo in Uruguay, Universidad Monteávila in Venezuela, Panamerican University in Mexico, University of Piura in Peru, and Villanueva University in Spain.

Schools associated with Opus Dei include:

- Aspaen Gimnasio Iragua in Colombia
- Colégio Planalto in Portugal
- Parents for Education (PARED) schools in Australia
- PAREF Schools in the Philippines
- Tak Sun Secondary School in Hong Kong
- The Heights School, Northridge Preparatory School, Oakcrest School, and Willows Academy in the United States

== Relations with Catholic leaders ==
Leopoldo Eijo y Garay, the bishop of Madrid, where Opus Dei was established, gave written approval to Opus Dei in 1941. He defended it against criticism from Jesuits about operating in secrecy, including saying that "Opus is truly of God".

Australian bishop Thomas Muldoon said that Pope Pius XII told the most senior Australian bishop, Cardinal Norman Gilroy, that Escrivá "is a true saint, a man sent by God for our times". Under Pius XII, the Holy See approved Opus Dei as a secular institute of pontifical right, provisionally in 1947 and finalized in 1950.

In 1962, Escrivá asked the Holy See to change the status of the organization from a secular institute to a prelature, which was denied.

The relationship between Pope Paul VI and Escrivá, according to Joan Estruch, a professor of sociology, was "troubled, and frequently conflictive".

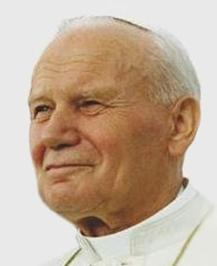
Pope John Paul II stated Opus Dei was founded "led by divine inspiration".

Pope John Paul II was a strong supporter of Opus Dei and said its aim of sanctifying secular activities was a "great ideal". He said that Escrivá's founding of Opus Dei was ductus divina inspiratione, led by divine inspiration, and he granted the organization its status as a personal prelature. Stating that Escrivá is "counted among the great witnesses of Christianity", John Paul II canonized him in 2002 and called him "the saint of ordinary life".

Concerning the group's role in the Catholic Church, critics have argued that Opus Dei's unique status as a personal prelature gives it too much independence, making it essentially a "church within a church" and that Opus Dei exerts a disproportionately large influence within the Catholic Church itself, as illustrated, for example, by the rapid canonization of Escrivá, which some considered to be irregular (27 years). In contrast, Catholic officials say that church authorities have even greater control of Opus Dei now that its head is a prelate appointed by the Pope, and its status as a prelature "precisely means dependence". Allen says that Escrivá's relatively quick canonization does not have anything to do with power but with improvements in procedures and John Paul II's decision to make Escrivá's sanctity and message known. The canonizations of John Paul II himself and Mother Teresa were much faster than Escrivá's.

Pope Benedict XVI supported Opus Dei and Escrivá. Pointing to the name "Work of God", Benedict XVI (then Cardinal Joseph Ratzinger) wrote that "The Lord simply made use of [Escrivá] who allowed God to work." Ratzinger cited Escrivá for correcting the mistaken idea that holiness is reserved for some extraordinary people who are completely different from ordinary sinners. Ratzinger spoke of Opus Dei's "surprising union of absolute fidelity to the Church's great tradition, to its faith, and unconditional openness to all the challenges of this world, whether in the academic world, in the field of work, or in matters of the economy, etc."

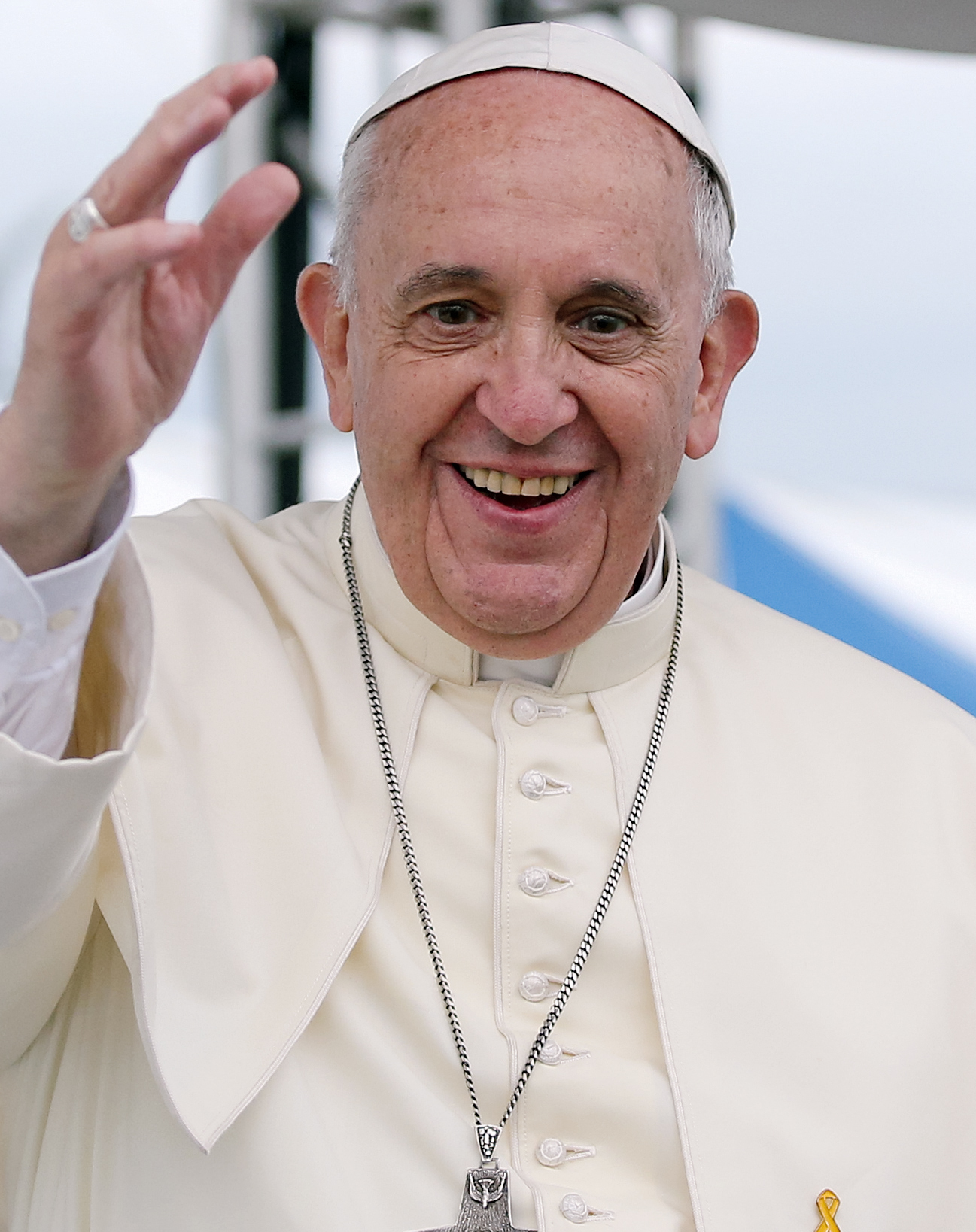
Pope Francis stated, "St. Josemaria is a precursor of Vatican II in proposing the universal call to holiness"

Pope Francis was "the first Pope who . . . dealt with Opus Dei closely as a bishop", and, according to fellow Jesuit James V. Schall, was a "friend of Opus Dei". Pope Francis himself said that "I am very close friend of the Opus Dei, I love them a lot." Francis referred to St. Josemaria as "a precursor of Vatican II in proposing the universal call to holiness". In the analysis of John Allen, Pope Francis' strong dislike for clericalism, which he calls "one of the worst evils" in the church, is a key factor for "what Francis admires about Opus Dei since Escrivá's emphasis on the dignity of the laity was a challenge to the ultra-clerical ethos of Spanish Catholicism in the late 1920s." He had a devotion to St. Josemaria, and he prayed before his relics for 45 minutes when he once visited the church of the prelature in Rome. Francis beatified Alvaro del Portillo, the successor of Escrivá. Francis, then Cardinal Bergoglio, said that what he most liked about Opus Dei was the work done for the poor by one of its schools in Buenos Aires. He thanked Opus Dei for its work to further the holiness of priests in the Roman Curia.

A week after his election, Pope Leo XIV met with the Prelate of Opus Dei, Msgr. Fernando Ocariz, and "expressed his closeness and affection," showing "great interest" in Opus Dei's work on its statutes. As bishop of Chiclayo, who succeeded two Opus Dei bishops who headed the diocese for a total of 45 years, he built upon their work, and appointed several members of Opus Dei in "significant positions", calling them hardworking and obedient. Leo XIV met in 2026 with Gareth Gore, a journalist whose book documented alleged abuses within the organization, which have been disputed by Opus Dei.

== Controversy ==
Throughout its history, Opus Dei has been criticized from many quarters, prompting journalists to describe Opus Dei as "the most controversial force in the Catholic Church", and founder Josemaría Escrivá as a "polarizing" figure. Criticism of Opus Dei has centered on allegations of secretiveness, controversial and aggressive recruiting methods, strict rules governing members, elitism, treatment of women, and support of or participation in authoritarian or right-wing governments, including Francisco Franco's dictatorship, which governed Spain until 1975. A former member accused its founder of misogyny. The mortification of the flesh practiced by some of its members is also criticized. Opus Dei has also been criticized for allegedly seeking independence and more influence within the Catholic Church. Some journalists have researched Opus Dei separately, with many other criticisms against Opus Dei allegedly based on fabrications by opponents.

Critics such as the Jesuit Wlodimir Ledóchowski refer to Opus Dei as a Catholic, Christian, or White form of Freemasonry. Critics of Opus Dei include María del Carmen Tapia, an ex-member who was a high-ranking officer of Opus Dei for many years; liberal Catholic theologians such as James Martin, a Jesuit writer and editor; and supporters of liberation theology, such as journalist Penny Lernoux and Michael Walsh, a writer on religious matters and former Jesuit. Critics state that Opus Dei is "intensely secretive." However, members broadly make their affiliations public and host activities for all ages. This practice has led to much speculation about who may be a member. Due in part to its secrecy, the Jesuit-run magazine America in 1995 referred to it as "the most controversial group in the Catholic Church today".

Opus Dei has been accused of deceptive and aggressive recruitment practices, such as showering potential members with intense praise ("love bombing"), and instructing numeraries to form friendships and attend social gatherings explicitly for recruiting purposes. Critics allege that Opus Dei maintains an extremely high degree of control over its members—for instance, past rules required numeraries to submit their incoming and outgoing mail to their superiors for inspection, and members are forbidden to read certain books without permission from their superiors. Critics charge that Opus Dei pressures numeraries to sever contact with non-members, including their own families. Exit counselor David Clark has described Opus Dei as "very cult-like". Opus Dei was investigated as a cult by the Belgian government after an investigation, and some aspects were found to be cult-like. The organisation has parallels with, but also very strong differences to, Scientology.

Critics assert that Escrivá and the organization supported radical right-wing governments, such as those of Franco, Augusto Pinochet and Alberto Fujimori of Peru during the 1990s. Both Pinochet's and Fujimori's ministries and prominent supporters allegedly included members of Opus Dei. Likewise, among Opus Dei members, there were also strong detractors of Franco, such as Antonio Fontán. There have also been allegations that Escrivá expressed sympathy for Adolf Hitler. One former Opus Dei priest, Vladimir Felzmann, who has become a vocal Opus Dei critic, says that Escrivá once remarked that Hitler had been "badly treated" by the world and he further declared that "Hitler couldn't have been such a bad person. He couldn't have killed six million [Jews]. It couldn't have been more than four million." Opus Dei has also been accused of elitism through targeting of "the intellectual elite, the well-to-do, and the socially prominent".

As members of Opus Dei are Catholics, Opus Dei has been subjected to the same criticisms targeted to Catholicism in general. For example, Opus Dei's position has been "to oppose sexual freedoms and promote conservative morals," according to an investigative report produced by Catholics for Choice, a group that dissents from many church teachings, notably abortion. The report further cites a study from sociologist Marco Burgos alleging Opus Dei interference in sex education programs in Honduras that contradict the Catholic faith.

Between 1950 and 1980, as many as 300,000 illegal adoptions occurred in Spain in a scandal known as the lost children of Francoism. Many Catholic clergy and religious sisters at church-sponsored hospitals or other charitable organizations in Spain are alleged to have been involved, including members of Opus Dei. The Opus Dei organisation has been described as a "Holy Mafia" or "Santa Mafia" in the 1970s due to alleged "inscrutable business practices". After conducting a critical study of Opus Dei, Catholic journalist John L. Allen Jr. concluded that Opus Dei should (1) be more transparent, (2) collaborate with members of religious institutes, and (3) encourage its members to air out in public their criticisms of the institution.

In 2024, articles in Financial Times and El Pais accused Opus Dei of practices akin to modern slavery. They draw on testimony from women who served as numerary assistants over several decades in several countries. FT reported that they were "coerced into domestic servitude ... through a rigid system of psychological control". In the same year, journalist Gareth Gore wrote a book alleging that Opus Dei fostered secrecy, abusive internal practices, political influence, and exploitative treatment of some members.

=== Supporting views ===
According to several journalists who have worked independently on Opus Dei, such as John L. Allen Jr., Vittorio Messori, Patrice de Plunkett, Maggy Whitehouse, and Noam Friedlander, many of the criticisms against Opus Dei are myths and unproven tales. Allen, Messori, and Plunkett say that most of these myths were created by its opponents, with Allen adding that he perceives that Opus Dei members generally practice what they preach.

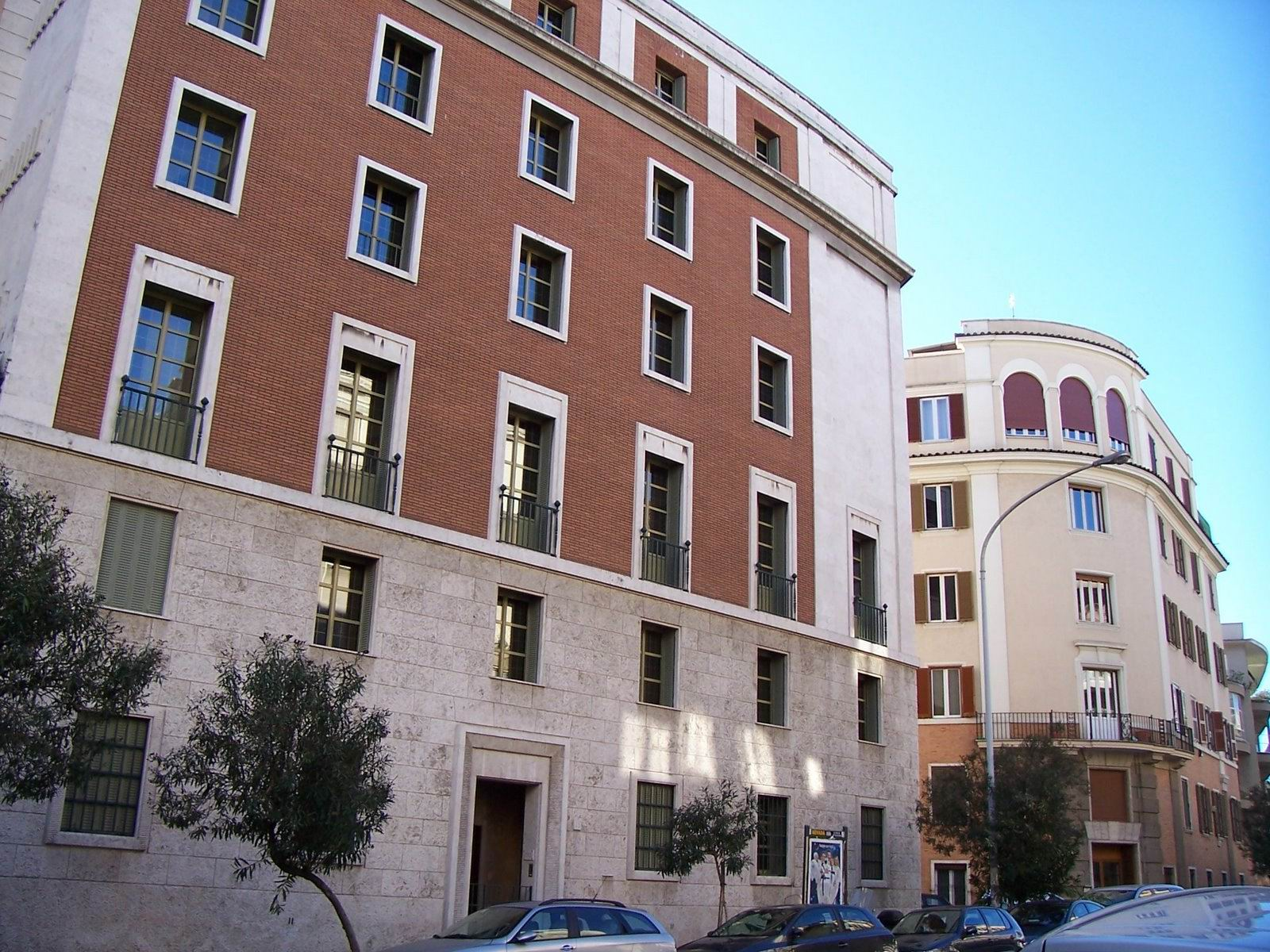
Opus Dei central headquarters in Rome

Allen, Messori, and Plunkett also state that accusations that Opus Dei is secretive are unfounded. These accusations stem from a clerical paradigm which expects Opus Dei members to behave as monks and clerics, traditionally known and externally identifiable as seekers of holiness. In contrast, these journalists continue, Opus Dei's lay members, like any normal Catholic professional, are ultimately responsible for their personal actions and do not externally represent the organization that provides them religious education. Writer and broadcast analyst John L. Allen Jr. states that Opus Dei provides abundant information about itself. These journalists have noted that the historic roots of criticisms against Opus Dei can be found in influential clerical circles.

As to its alleged participation in right-wing politics, especially the Francoist regime, British historians Paul Preston and Brian Crozier state that the Opus Dei members who were Franco's ministers were appointed for their talent and not for their Opus Dei membership. Also, there were notable members of Opus Dei who were vocal critics of the Franco regime such as Rafael Calvo Serer and Antonio Fontán, who was the first president of the Senate in Spain, following the adoption of a democratic constitution. The German historian and Opus Dei member Peter Berglar calls any connection made between Opus Dei and Franco's regime a "gross slander". At the end of Franco's regime, Opus Dei members were 50:50 for and against Franco, according to John Allen. Similarly Álvaro del Portillo, the former prelate of Opus Dei, said that any statements that Escrivá supported Hitler were "a patent falsehood" that were part of "a slanderous campaign". He and others have stated that Escrivá condemned Hitler as a "rogue", a "racist" and a "tyrant". Opus Dei spokespersons also deny claims that Opus Dei members worked with General Pinochet. Various authors and researchers state that Escrivá was staunchly non-political, and detested dictatorships. Allen wrote that, compared with other Catholic organizations, Opus Dei's stress on freedom and personal responsibility is extraordinarily strong. There are many Opus Dei members who are identified with center or left-wing politics, including Ruth Kelly, Jorge Rossi Chavarría, Mario Fernández Baeza, Mario Maiolo, and Jesus Estanislao.

While Opus Dei spokespersons have admitted mistakes in dealing with some members and do not, as a rule, contest their grievances, supporters have rejected generalizations merely based on negative experiences of some members. John Allen concluded that Opus Dei is not "elitist" in the sense in which people often invoke the term, meaning an exclusively white-collar phenomenon. He observed that among its members are barbers, bricklayers, mechanics, and fruit sellers. Most supernumeraries are living ordinary middle-class lives, he said. Regarding alleged misogyny, John Allen states that women hold half of the leadership positions in Opus Dei, and they supervise men. As regards the claim that religious people in Spain, including Opus Dei members, were involved in the abduction of children during the Franco era, an investigation found that DNA analysis of 81 cases ruled out that they were stolen babies. The supreme court of Spain did not consider the first case of stolen babies to be proven, and the chief prosecutor of the Basque Country said that "not even reasonable evidence" of any abduction of babies had been found, after special investigations of the police.

In response to the Financial Times and El Pais articles, Opus Dei denied the allegations, stating that membership in Opus Dei requires repeated and explicit personal consent over several years and members can request to live in another country. As regards the book of Gore, Opus Dei stated that it presented “a false picture of Opus Dei based on distorted facts, conspiracy theories and outright lies,” and published a detailed critique. Bill Donohue of the Catholic League also criticized the book, arguing that it relied on anti-Catholic stereotypes, wrong data, and misleading interpretations of Opus Dei’s institutional history and mission.

=== Other views ===
Sociologists Peter Berger and Samuel Huntington suggest that Opus Dei is involved in "a deliberate attempt to construct an alternative modernity", one that engages modern culture while at the same time is resolutely loyal to Catholic traditions. Van Biema of Time magazine emphasises Opus Dei's Spanish roots as a source of misunderstandings in the Anglosphere, and suggests that as the United States becomes more Hispanic, controversies about Opus Dei (and similar Catholic organizations) will decrease.

In her 2006 book on Opus Dei, Maggy Whitehouse, a non-Catholic journalist, argues that the relative autonomy of each director and center has resulted in mistakes at the local level. She recommends greater consistency and transparency for Opus Dei, which she sees as having learned the lesson of greater openness when it faced the issues raised by The Da Vinci Code and other critics.

One of the documents of the Second Vatican Council known as the Pastoral Constitution of the Church in the Modern World provides some good context. This document elaborates upon the relationship of the Church to the world at large. Catholic Social Teaching and Christian Secularity elaborate further. In 2005, John Allen published his text about Opus Dei. In 2012, Eric Sammons published a short work, "Holiness for Everyone", about the practical spirituality of St Josemaría Escrivá.

Criticisms against Opus Dei have prompted Catholic scholars and writers like Piers Paul Read and Vittorio Messori to call Opus Dei a sign of contradiction, in reference to the biblical quote of Jesus as a "sign that is spoken against". John Carmel Heenan, Cardinal Archbishop of Westminster, said: "One of the proofs of God's favor is to be a sign of contradiction. Almost all founders of societies in the Church have suffered. Monsignor Escrivá de Balaguer is no exception. Opus Dei has been attacked, and its motives misunderstood. In this country and elsewhere, an inquiry has always vindicated Opus Dei."

== Media representation ==
In the 21st century, Opus Dei has received international attention due to the novel The Da Vinci Code and its 2006 film adaptation, both of which prominent Christians and others criticized as misleading, inaccurate and anti-Catholic.

== Leadership ==
Founder

- 1928–1975: Josemaría Escrivá

Prelates of Opus Dei

- 1975–1994: Álvaro del Portillo (as General President, 1975–1982)
- 1994–2016: Javier Echevarría Rodríguez
- 2017–present: Fernando Ocáriz Braña

== See also ==
- Opus Dei (book)
- Opus Dei and politics
