= New evangelization =

Catholic Church's modernization of its approach to preaching the Gospel

The new evangelization refers to the renewed effort by baptized Catholics to manifest the universal call to evangelization inherent in the Christian faith. This movement reaffirms that every Christian is called, by the very act of baptism, to live out and spread the Gospel in accordance with Jesus Christ’s Great Commission to make disciples of all nations, teaching all Christ's commands to all (cf. Mt 28:6–12).

The Second Vatican Council emphasized this teaching together with the universal call to holiness since the very fact of baptism, which configures one to Jesus Christ, makes the Christian another Christ, the holy redeemer of all men. It taught that the Christian vocation by its very nature is also a vocation to the apostolate.

== Meaning of new evangelization ==
According to Pope Francis in Evangelii gaudium in 2013: "the XIII Ordinary General Assembly of the Synod of Bishops gathered from 7–28 October 2012 to discuss the theme: The New Evangelization for the Transmission of the Christian Faith. The Synod reaffirmed that the new evangelization is a summons addressed to all and that it is carried out in three principal settings". The three settings were: 1) ordinary pastoral ministry (to inflame the hearts of the faithful), 2) outreach to "the baptized whose lives do not reflect the demands of Baptism" and 3) evangelization to those who do not know Jesus Christ or who have always rejected him.

Relative to the second setting, one emphasis has been re-evangelizing of Christians who have fallen away from the faith. There has been a special focus on Europe and the Americas, areas which have traditionally been Catholic but which have been heavily influenced by secularization.

== Early Church and Fathers of the Church ==
Given Jesus' teachings on love, service and the Great Commission and his Resurrection from the dead, the early Christians boldly spread the Gospel, not just the Apostles but also the ordinary Christians and families all throughout the Roman Empire and in other lands. Like St. Paul, all the baptized felt "the duty to evangelize: 'If I preach the Gospel, this is no reason for me to boast; it is a duty for me. Woe to me if I do not preach the Gospel!'"

In the second century, St. Justin taught that Christians are called not only to follow Christ in belief but also in every aspect of their conduct, including their duty to lead others to the truth.

In the third century, Origen expanded this idea by asserting that the mission of sharing the faith is incumbent on every disciple, not just the apostles, meaning that every informed believer has an obligation to teach and guide others.

In the fourth century, St. John Chrysostom stressed that effective evangelization comes both from one’s words and from a life modeled after Christ’s teachings—an active love that cares for one’s neighbor.

In the fourth and fifth century, St. Augustine underlined that genuine Christian charity involves guiding others to a similar love for God. while St. Gregory the Great every faithful person bears the responsibility of being a preacher by both his life and words.

== Saints on the duty of evangelization ==
The commitment to evangelization has long been a central theme in the spiritual writings and teachings of many saints:

St. Francis de Sales observed that while converting souls is a great act, nurturing and sustaining that conversion is even more significant while St. Alphonsus of Liguori affirmed that there is no act of charity greater than saving a soul.

St. Josemaria called a forerunner of the Second Vatican Council is called in the liturgy as the one who proclaimed the universal call to holiness and apostolate. He emphasized that each Christian’s personal vocation is inseparable from the call to evangelize. He argued that every believer is called to an apostolic mission without exception—regardless of age, health, or circumstance—and that the fruitfulness of one's apostolate determines the vitality of one's faith.

== Vatican II on the universal call to the apostolate ==
The Second Vatican Council emphasized the universal call to holiness, which Paul VI said is "the ultimate purpose of the teachings of the Council." This universal call to holiness includes the universal call to evangelization or apostolate:

According to the Second Vatican Council, all the baptized are commissioned by Christ himself to participate in the Church's apostolic mission. Through the sacraments—especially the Eucharist—Christians receive and are continually nourished by the charity that animates this mission. Laypeople, in particular, have a unique role: they are called to make the Church present and active in the world, especially in areas where clergy cannot easily reach. By their gifts and circumstances, every layperson becomes both a witness and an instrument of the Church’s mission.

The Council further affirms that the Church was established to spread Christ’s Kingdom throughout the world. Every action of the Church aimed at this mission is considered part of the apostolate, which involves all members of the Church. Because the Christian vocation is inherently a call to apostolic action, every member of the Body of Christ—like every part of a living body—has an active and indispensable role.

Evangelism is a theme in multiple Vatican II documents. These documents mentioned "gospel" 157 times, "evangelize" 18 times, and "evangelization" 31 times.

== Birthplace of the new evangelization ==
The birthplace of the new evangelization was Nowa Huta near Kraków in Poland where strenuous efforts for many years were made during communist rule to establish church land and a cross and church building in a new town where there was none. Speaking at Mogila Abbey near Nowa Huta in 1979, Pope John Paul II said: "From the Cross of Nowa Huta began the new evangelization".

== Papal use of new evangelization ==
The first frequent papal use of the term evangelization was by Pope Paul VI in his 1975 apostolic exhortation, Evangelii nuntiandi, which itself built upon documents from the Second Vatican Council including Lumen gentium, Ad gentes, Gaudium et spes, and Dignitatis humanae.

The term new evangelization was popularized by Pope John Paul II who used it during an address to the Latin American bishops in Port-au-Prince, Haiti on May 9, 1983. He declared that the fifth centenary of the first evangelization of the Americas (1492–1992) should mark the beginning of a new era of evangelization, "evangelization will gain its full energy if it is a commitment, not to re-evangelize but to a New Evangelization, new in its ardor, methods and expression". Pope John Paul II then expounded on the idea later, including his 1990 encyclical, Redemptoris missio, a Magna Carta of the new evangelization, his 1994 apostolic letter, Tertio millennio adveniente, issued for the Great Jubilee of the year 2000 and his 2001 apostolic exhortation, Novo millennio ineunte. In Redemptoris missio, he wrote:

I sense that the moment has come to commit all of the Church's energies to a new evangelization and to the mission ad gentes. No believer in Christ, no institution of the Church can avoid this supreme duty: to proclaim Christ to all peoples.

In 2010, Pope Benedict XVI established the Pontifical Council for Promoting the New Evangelization. When he called for a Year of Faith from 2012 to 2013 on the 50th anniversary of the Second Vatican Council, he opened it with a general assembly of the Synod of Bishops on The New Evangelization for the Transmission of the Christian Faith.

On June 29, 2013, Pope Francis released a related apostolic exhortation Evangelii gaudium (English: The Joy of the Gospel) on "the church's primary mission of evangelization in the modern world". In its opening paragraph, Pope Francis urged the entire church "to embark on a new chapter of evangelism".

As of April 2019, Pope Francis was reported to be planning a reorganization of the Curia that will make evangelization its principal focus. A final draft of his apostolic constitution on the Roman Curia, titled Praedicate Evangelium ("Preach the Gospel"), has been submitted for comment to national bishops' conferences and a variety of other bodies.

== Synod of Bishops ==
Year	Topic	Concluding document or apostolic exhortation
2012	The New Evangelization for the Transmission of the Christian Faith	Francis, Pope (24 November 2013), Evangelii gaudium (Apostolic exhortation), Rome: Libreria Editrice Vaticana

Bishop Robert Prevost, later Pope Leo XIV, attended this synod and provided an intervention talk for it.

== Responses to papal appeals ==
Since Pope John Paul II, the cultural sector was seen as one of the many priorities of the new evangelization. In recent years, therefore, the Catholic Church promoted its artistic heritage in several countries as a pastoral opportunity for the new evangelization, particularly in Europe.

In 2005, the Augustine Institute in Denver was established to train lay Catholics for the new evangelization.

In 2011, Saint John's Seminary in Boston established a Theological Institute for the New Evangelization, which offers a Master's of Theological Studies for the New Evangelization. The program is designed for laity, deacons, and professed religious.

In 2012, Franciscan University of Steubenville established the Father Michael Scanlan Chair of Biblical Theology and the New Evangelization.

In 2012, The Catholic Bishops' Conference of the Philippines issued a pastoral letter on the new evangelization with a nine year plan to help prepare Catholics for 2021, the 500th anniversary of the arrival of the Gospel in the Philippines.

On 12 December 2020, the feast of Our Lady of Guadalupe, the Archdiocese of Sydney announced its archdiocese-wide plan for evangelism called "Go Make Disciples". Go Make Disciples is the most far-reaching attempt to harness the resources of the Catholic Church within Australia in the service of the new evangelisation called for by all the modern popes since Pope Paul VI. It represents the personal vision of Archbishop Anthony Fisher for the future of the Archdiocese of Sydney.

On 11 December 2024, Earl K. Fernandes, bishop of the Diocese of Columbus, designated Our Lady of Guadalupe, Star of the New Evangelization as a diocesan shrine for pilgrimage and prayer.

== New media and new evangelization ==
New media tools such as the internet, social media and smartphones are being used as vehicles for expressing the new evangelization. Media organizations like EWTN, National Catholic Register, Word on Fire, Catholic Answers, Relevant Radio, Shalom World, Shalom TV are using the new media to promote the work of evangelization. Individuals do the same with their social media accounts like Facebook and Twitter.

== Role of the laity ==
One of the greatest contributions of the Second Vatican Council was the development of and emphasis on the role of the laity in the mission of the Church. The outcome of the new evangelization of the third millennium, envisioned by Vatican II, Pope John Paul II, Pope Benedict XVI, and Pope Francis rests largely in the faith and witness of the laity.
