= Great Commission =

Instruction of Jesus to his disciples to spread the gospel

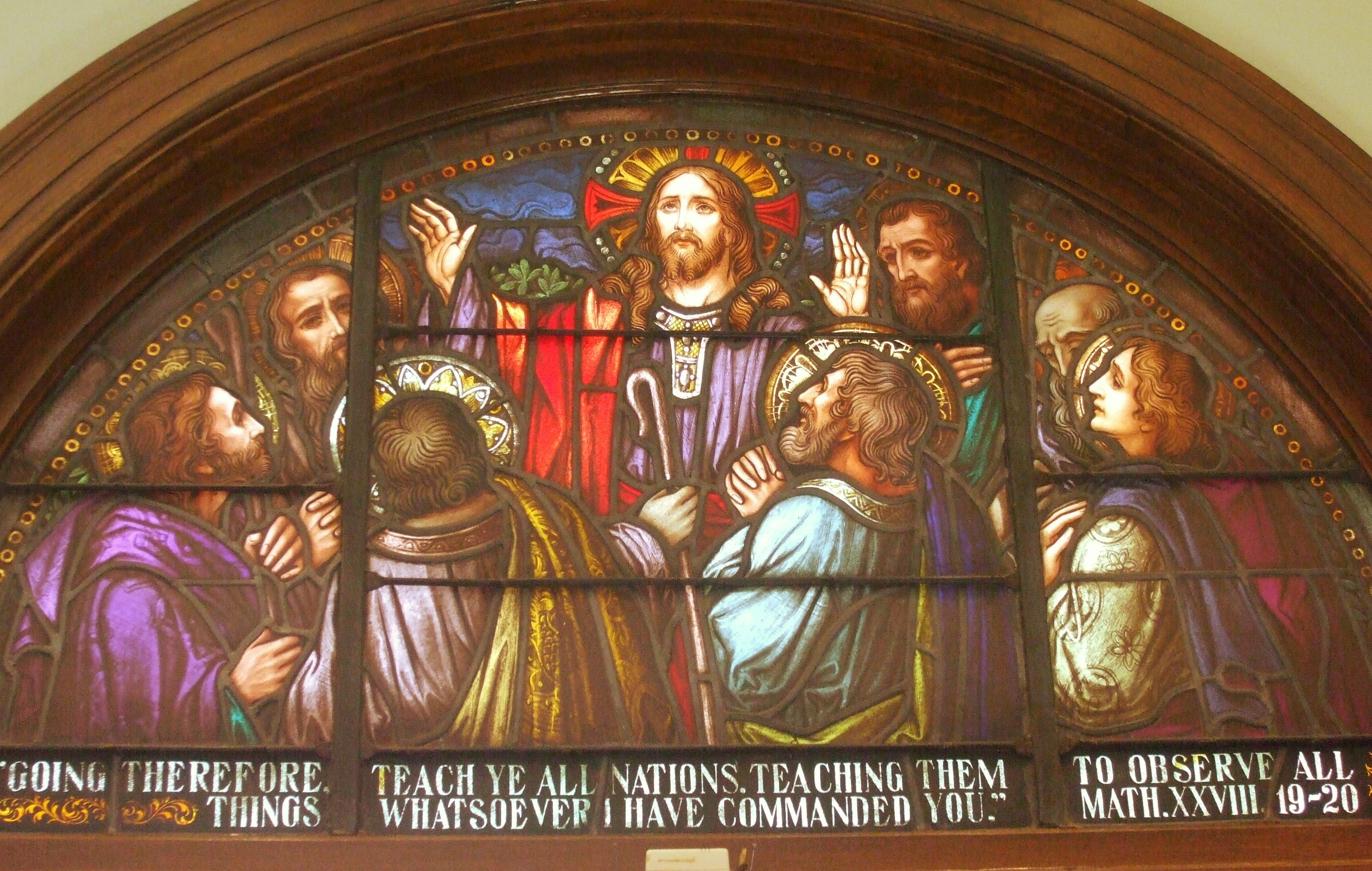
The Great Commission, stained glass window, Cathedral Parish of Saint Patrick in El Paso, Texas

In Christianity, the Great Commission is the instruction of the resurrected Jesus Christ to his disciples to spread the gospel to all the nations of the world. The Great Commission is outlined in Matthew 28:16–20, where on a mountain in Galilee Jesus calls on his followers to make disciples of and baptize all nations in the name of the Father, the Son, and the Holy Spirit.

The Great Commission is similar to the episodes of the commissioning of the Twelve Apostles found in the other Synoptic Gospels, though with significant differences. Luke also has Jesus during his ministry dispatching disciples, including the seventy disciples, sending them to all the nations and giving them power over demons. The dispersion of the Apostles in the traditional ending of Mark is thought to be a 2nd-century summary based on Matthew and Luke.

The Great Commission has become a tenet in Christian theology emphasizing ministry, missionary work, evangelism, and baptism. The apostles are said to have dispersed from Jerusalem and founded the apostolic sees, such as those at Corinth, Philippi, Ephesus, and Rome (see also Holy See). Preterists believe that the Great Commission and other Bible prophecies were fulfilled in the 1st century while futurists believe Bible prophecy has yet to be fulfilled at the Second Coming.

== History ==
It is not known who coined the term Great Commission, though it may have been Justinian von Welz and it was later popularized by Hudson Taylor.

== New Testament accounts ==
The following comparison table is primarily based on the King James Bible (KJV) English translation of the New Testament.

Matthew 28:16–20	Mark 16:14–18	Luke 24:44–49	John 20:19–23	Acts 1:4–8
The eleven disciples went to Galilee according the instructions of an angel, and later Jesus himself.; On the designated mountain they saw Jesus: some worshipped him, others still doubted.; Jesus: 'All power is given unto me in heaven and in earth. Go ye therefore, and teach all nations, baptizing them in the name of the Father, and of the Son, and of the Holy Ghost: Teaching them to observe all things whatsoever I have commanded you: and, lo, I am with you always, even unto the end of the world. Amen.'	Jesus appeared to the eleven disciples as they sat eating.; Jesus accused them of unbelief because they did not believe those who had allegedly seen him after he had risen.; Jesus: 'Go ye into all the world, and preach the gospel to every creature. He that believeth and is baptized shall be saved; but he that believeth not shall be damned.'	Jesus appeared in Jerusalem to the eleven disciples and others as they stood talking.; Jesus repeated that everything written about him in the Scriputes had to be fulfilled.; Jesus: 'Thus it is written, and thus it behoved Christ to suffer, and to rise from the dead the third day: And that repentance and remission of sins should be preached in his name among all nations, beginning at Jerusalem. And ye are witnesses of these things. And, behold, I send the promise of my Father upon you: but tarry ye in the city of Jerusalem, until ye be endued with power from on high.'	Jesus appeared in Jerusalem to the disciples (except Thomas) who were locked down in a house.; Jesus wished them peace twice and said: 'As my Father hath sent Me, even so send I you'.; Jesus blew the Holy Spirit over them, said: 'Receive ye the Holy Ghost: Whose soever sins ye remit, they are remitted unto them; and whose soever sins ye retain, they are retained.'.	Jesus taught the disciples for 40 days in Jerusalem.; Jesus: 'commanded them that they should not depart from Jerusalem, "but wait for the promise of the Father, which," saith he, "ye have heard of me. For John truly baptized with water; but ye shall be baptized with the Holy Ghost not many days hence."'; Disciples asked if Jesus would soon restore the kingdom to Israel.; Jesus: 'It is not for you to know the times or the seasons, which the Father hath put in his own power. But ye shall receive power, after that the Holy Ghost is come upon you: and ye shall be witnesses unto me both in Jerusalem, and in all Judaea, and in Samaria, and unto the uttermost part of the earth.'

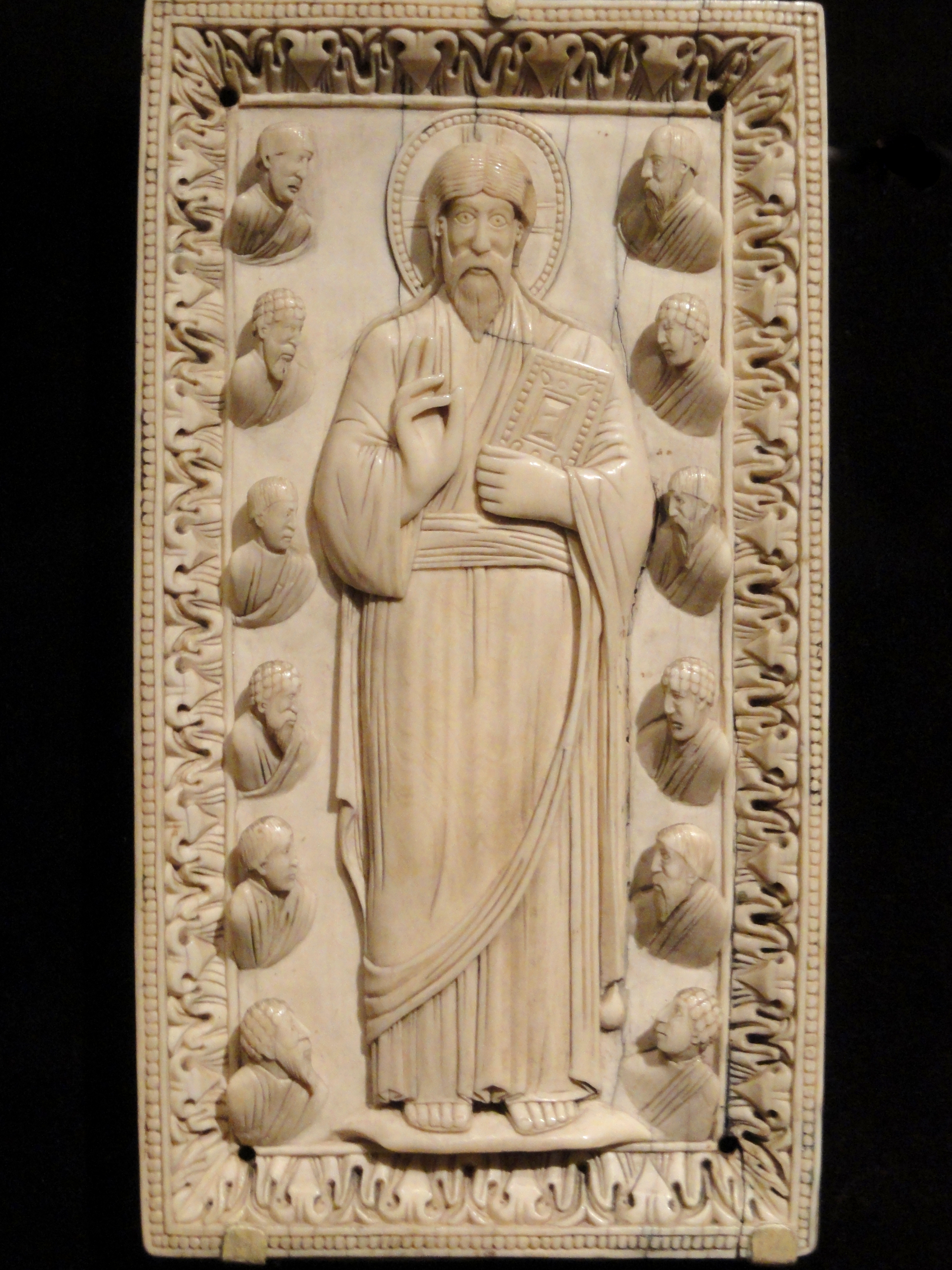
10th-century Ottonian ivory plaque showing Christ's mission to the apostles in the Cleveland Museum of Art

=== Matthew ===
The Great Commission is the final verse in Matthew's gospel (Matthew 28:16–20). Jesus gives it to the disciples on a Galilean mountain to which he had directed them. They worship him when they see him. John Nolland says that Matthew has heavily reworked the source material that also lies behind other New Testament texts, especially Luke 24:47. He also notes that Matthew does not specificy the mountain, but as in Matthew 5:1, this setting signals the significance of the event. Craig Blomberg reads the passage as the climax of the whole Gospel, because it contains several of Matthew's key themes in summary form. These include the importance of discipleship, the disciples' mixture of faith and doubt, the universal mission of the church, Jesus's commandments as the centre of God's will, and his abiding presence as teacher.

Nolland, Benjamin Hubbard, and Craig S. Keener argue that the passage follows the form of Old Testament call narratives such as Exodus 3:1–4:16, Judges 6:11–21 and Jeremiah 1:4–10. Each of these include a promise of God's presence to the one sent. Nolland also considers influence from the decree of Cyrus in 2 Chronicles 36:23 possible. The parallels include that it stands at the end of its work, contains an authority statement that names heaven and earth, involves a fresh beginning for God's people, directs them to a task, and speaks of God being with those who go.

In Luke and John he does mention the forgiveness of sins which is not mentioned in Matthew (although this is implied by the command to baptise), while Matthew contains instructions for the eleven apostles to be teachers and makers of disciples, which is not present in Luke and John.

Proposed chiastic structure of Matthew 28:18–20 by Nolland
A	Authority: "All authority in heaven and on earth has been given to me" (v.18)
B	Discipling: "make disciples of all nations" (v.19)
C	Baptising in the name of the Father, the Son and the Holy Spirit (v.19)
B′	Teaching: "to observe all that I have commanded you" (v.20)
A′	Presence: "I am with you always, to the end of the age" (v.20)

Nolland proposes that Jesus's words may be arranged as a chiasmus centred on the command to baptise. The discipling and teaching statements provide the first frame, and the statements about authority (Matthew 28:18) and presence (Matthew 28:20) at the outer edges. The closing promise, "I am with you always, to the end of the age", echoes the name Immanuel, "God with us", given to Jesus in Matthew 1:23, so that the Gospel ends as it began. Nolland observes that Matthew, who stresses the continuing presence of Jesus, does not narrate an ascension, as Luke and John do.

=== Parallels in Luke, Acts, John and Mark ===
N. T. Wright notes that the commissioning scenes in Luke 24:44–49 and John 20:21–23, like that of Matthew's closing scene, concentrate on the risen Jesus's instructions for a worldwide mission.

In the scene in Luke, which takes place in Jerusalem, Jesus expounds the Scriptures to the disciples and tells them to proclaim repentance for the forgiveness of sins to all nations, but that they are to wait in the city for power from on high. Darrell L. Bock names five elements in this mission statement: preaching, a call to repentance, the offer of forgiveness, authority residing in Jesus's name, and a message for all nations.

Blomberg notes that in Luke, all of the resurrection appearances take place in Jerusalem, and that the passage predicts the Spirit's empowering of the disciples at Pentecost. I. Howard Marshall reads Jesus's last words before the ascension in Acts 1:8, which says that the disciples will be his witnesses in Jerusalem, Judea, Samaria and to the end of the earth, as a possible alternative version of Luke, bearing in mind the Luke-Acts connection. He also notes that the structure of Acts broadly follows this command.

In John 20:21, the risen Jesus tells the disciples, "As the Father has sent me, even so I am sending you". Keener compares this with the final commissions in Matthew and Luke–Acts, and concludes that John preserves the main elements of his commission from an earlier tradition. He interprets Jesus to mean that the disciples should continue his own mission.

The command to preach the gospel to the whole creation in Mark 16:15 belongs to the longer ending of Mark. Wright reports the great majority of contemporary commentators regard this as not written by Mark with high certainty. Wright treats the commission in that verse as parallel to Matthew's.

== Analysis ==
=== Authority ===
The commission is grounded in the statement that "all authority in heaven and on earth has been given to me" (Matthew 28:18). Scholars believe an allusion to Daniel 7:13–14 as very likely. There the Septuagint says of "one like a son of man" that authority was given to him, using the same words, ἐδόθη (edothē, "was given") and ἐξουσία (exousia, "authority"), and it relates that authority to πάντα τὰ ἔθνη (panta ta ethnē, "all the nations"), in the next verse. However, Nolland argues that Matthew has already presented Jesus as exercising authority during his ministry (Matthew 9:6; Matthew 11:27), so that the verse probably reaffirms Jesus' authority after his rejection by the Jerusalem leaders, given that God has vindicated him by raising him from the dead.

Wright observes that the phrase "in heaven and on earth" in the commission is almost identical to the kingdom clause of Matthew's version of the Lord's Prayer. He argues that through the resurrection, Jesus now holds the role marked out for the Messiah in Psalm 2, Psalm 72 and Psalm 89, concentrated in the "son of man" figure of Daniel 7, and that it is this authority by which Matthew implies the worldwide commission is valid.

=== Make disciples of all nations ===
The word "go" in the English translation is a participle that modifies the main verb, not a full imperative in itself. The only imperative verb in the Greek of Matthew 28:19–20 is μαθητεύσατε (mathēteusate, "make disciples"). According to Blomberg, "go" therefore functions only as a mild imperative. He concludes that the main command is to reproduce Christian followers wherever one is, with only a subordinate emphasis on going into the whole world. Because disciple-making is defined as baptising people and teaching them to obey everything Jesus commanded, Blomberg concludes that the main point of the commission is about the lifelong process of bringing people to faith and nurturing them in the will of God; it is only secondarily about initial evangelism. Nolland notes that Matthew has used the verb "to disciple" before, of the scribe "trained for the kingdom" (Matthew 13:52) and of Joseph of Arimathea (Matthew 27:57). He concludes that the eleven are to teach first of all what Jesus taught them for their own obedience, above all the Sermon on the Mount.

"All nations" could also be translated "all the Gentiles", so that some interpreters interpret it as an end to the mission to the Jews. However, other scholars argue that Matthew's most recent uses of the word (Matthew 24:9; Matthew 24:14; Matthew 25:32) carry the inclusive sense of peoples, Jews among them. According to Nolland, when Matthew speaks of "all the nations" he means the whole of humanity, which widens the scope of Matthew 10:5–6, where the Twelve were sent only to Israel, to take in the whole of humanity, Jews included. He also observes that the Council of Jerusalem (Acts 15:1–29), with differences of opinion about a mission to the Gentiles, is evidence against a mission to the Gentiles being as obvious to the first disciples as the risen Jesus's instruction makes it appear. He suggests that Matthew and Luke are compressing a development that the church came to recognise as the will of the risen Jesus, only after some time. Bock also notes that the early Christians at first interpreted the commission preaching to all nations to mean preaching to Jews of the diaspora, and did not grasp that the message was for all humanity until Peter's vision and the conversion of Cornelius (Acts 10:34–43).

=== Baptismal formula ===
The command to baptise "in the name of the Father and of the Son and of the Holy Spirit" is the only appearance of this wording in the Gospels. Nolland notes that elsewhere in the New Testament baptism is "in the name of Jesus" (in Acts) or "into Christ" (in Paul). The Matthean form is both distinctive, and the one used most often in later Christian baptismal practice. Nolland finds it unlikely that Matthew was quoting a baptismal rite, because the different versions in New Testament shows that there was as yet no agreed formula. He attributes the judgment of many scholars that the words are foreign to Matthew to reading them against a later liturgical setting, and finds the language well rooted in the Gospel's own use of "Father", "Son" and "Holy Spirit". Blomberg agrees that the expression had probably not yet become a technical formula (compare Acts 2:38). Wright says that it is not the earliest trinitarian formula in the New Testament, citing 2 Corinthians 13:14 and Galatians 4:4–7, so that the trinitarian reference cannot by itself support a late date for the passage (referring to the assumption that the doctrine of the trinity developed later). Nolland records that Eusebius sometimes quotes the verse with "in my name" in place of the triadic phrase, perhaps abbreviating in paraphrase (see Matthew 28:19).

== Interpretations ==
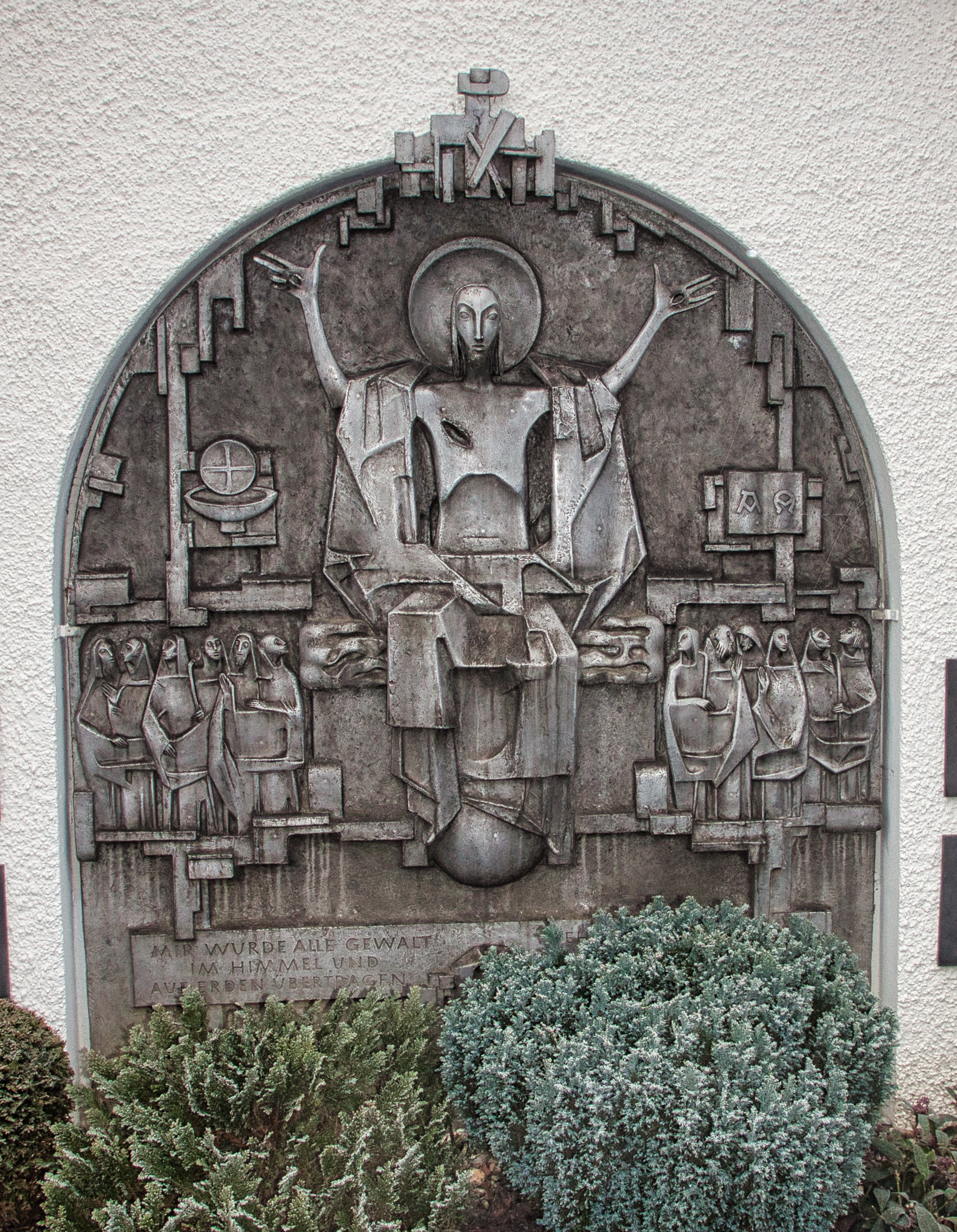
Relief The Great Commission, c. 1973 by Albert Wider on the priests' grave in Widnau, Switzerland

Although the command was initially given directly only to Christ's eleven Apostles, evangelical Christian theology has typically interpreted the commission as a directive to all Christians of every time and place, particularly because it seems to be a restatement or moving forward of the last part of God's covenant with Abraham in Genesis 12:3.

Full Preterists believe that the Great Commission was already fulfilled based on the New Testament passages "And they went out and preached everywhere" (Mark 16:20), "the gospel that you have heard, which was proclaimed in all creation under heaven" (Colossians 1:23), and "Now to Him who is able to establish you according to my gospel and the preaching of Jesus Christ, according to the revelation of the mystery which has been kept secret for long ages past, but now is manifested, and by the scriptures of the prophets, according to the commandment of the eternal God, has been made known to all the nations" (Romans 16:25–26).

== See also ==
- Ad gentes
- Evangelii gaudium
- Evangelii nuntiandi
- Evangelism
- Matthew 28:16, 17, 18, 19, 20
- New evangelization
- Overview of resurrection appearances in the Gospels and Paul
- Redemptoris Missio
