= Frequent confession =

Christian religious practice

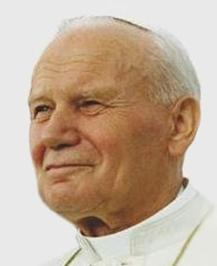
John Paul II went to confession weekly.

Frequent confession is the spiritual practice among many Christians, especially Catholics, Lutherans and some Anglicans, of going to the confession and absolution often and regularly in order to grow in holiness.

A recommended frequency, based on the teachings of past popes and canon law, is between once a month and once a week.

This practice "was introduced into the Church by the inspiration of the Holy Spirit", according to Pius XII. Confession of everyday faults is "strongly recommended by the Church", according to the Catechism of the Catholic Church 1458. Paul VI said that frequent Confession is "of great value". According to Rev. Salvador M. Ferigle's study of Church law and teachings, "whenever possible, frequent Confession will ordinarily mean between once a month and once a week."

Within the Lutheran Churches, as well as among certain high church Anglicans, frequent Confession and Absolution is encouraged in the same way.

== Basis and importance ==
The Catholic Church teaches that everyone is called to sanctity, since man was created to love and serve God, the ultimate source of man's happiness. For this, God has given the sacraments as God's way of giving divine life to each person.

The Catechism of the Catholic Church teaches:

Without being strictly necessary, confession of everyday faults (venial sins) is nevertheless strongly recommended by the Church. Indeed the regular Confession of our venial sins helps us form our conscience, fight against evil tendencies, let ourselves be healed by Christ and progress in the life of the Spirit. By receiving more frequently through this sacrament the gift of the Father's mercy, we are spurred to be merciful as he is merciful. (CCC 1458)

In his Apostolic exhortation, Reconcilatio et Paenitentia, John Paul II also encouraged frequent confession even if only of venial sins:

"We shall also do well to recall that, for a balanced spiritual and pastoral orientation in this regard, great importance must continue to be given to teaching the faithful also to make use of the sacrament of penance for venial sins alone, as is borne out by a centuries-old doctrinal tradition and practice.

"Though the church knows and teaches that venial sins are forgiven in other ways too—for instance, by acts of sorrow, works of charity, prayer, penitential rites—she does not cease to remind everyone of the special usefulness of the sacramental moment for these sins too. The frequent use of the sacrament—to which some categories of the faithful are in fact held—strengthens the awareness that even minor sins offend God and harm the church, the body of Christ. Its celebration then becomes for the faithful 'the occasion and the incentive to conform themselves more closely to Christ and to make themselves more docile to the voice of the Spirit.' Above all it should be emphasized that the grace proper to the sacramental celebration has a great remedial power and helps to remove the very roots of sin."(32; citing Ordo Paenitentiae, 17)

Lutheran writer Peggy Pedersen wrote with regard to the benefit of frequent confession:

It is perfectly acceptable to simply make a general confession without details, and the pastor will not probe. But it helps to openly state those things we most need to hear God has forgiven. In fact, this is why, although we daily confess our sins to God, we also need the grace of private confession and absolution. We need to hear those words spoken directly to us: “In the stead and by the command of my Lord Jesus Christ, I forgive you all your sins in the name of the Father and of the Son and of the Holy Spirit.” As a servant of our Lord, our pastor has been given the keys to the Kingdom of Heaven. That is why I am assured this absolution comes straight from the Throne of God for me. Those words are like cool water to a parched throat.

== Recommended frequency ==
According to Rev. Fr. Sal Ferigle, "For those who sincerely wish to do their best to avail themselves of the opportunity of frequent Confession in order to grow spiritually, frequent Confession will ordinarily be linked to having a fixed confessor. The confessor will be the best qualified person to suggest the frequency suited to the spiritual development and the physical and moral possibilities of the penitent. Within those rather broad limits of flexibility and to seek a general rule of common sense, we can refer to [Paul VI's General Audiences] which speaks about 'receiving the Sacrament of Penance frequently, that is twice a month.' Previous legislation which specified regular intervals for Confession spoke about weekly Confession. One can therefore say in general terms that, whenever possible, frequent Confession will ordinarily mean between once a month and once a week."

== See also ==
- Morning Offering
- Thanksgiving after Communion
- Rosary
- Spiritual reading
- Angelus
- Memorare
- Visit to the Blessed Sacrament
- Examination of conscience
