= Dispersion of the Apostles =

Missionary work of Jesus's Apostles after his ascension

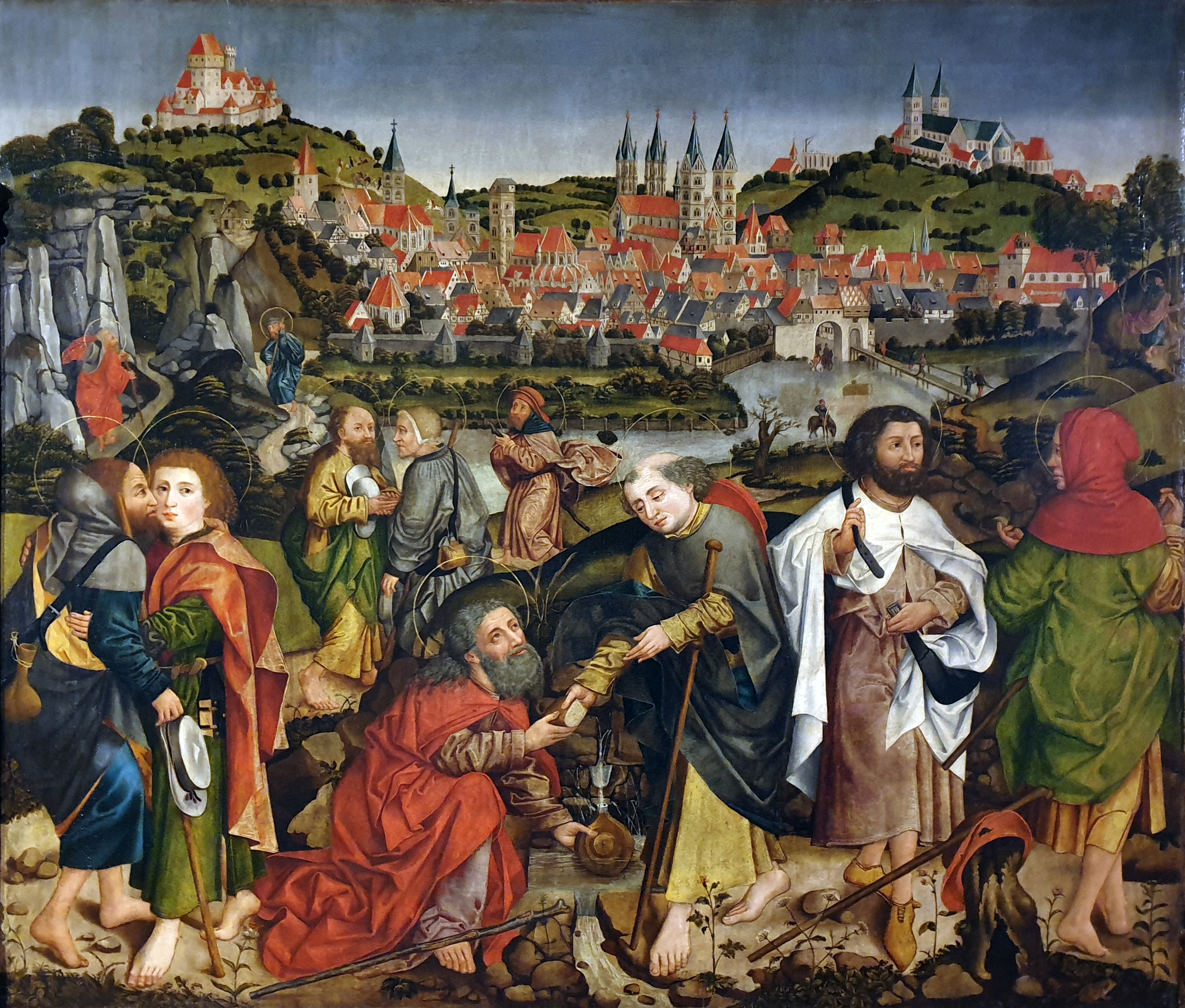
Apostle Farewell (1485) painting by Katzheimer

The Christian Gospels of Mark and Matthew say that, after the Ascension of Jesus, his Apostles "went out and preached everywhere". This is described in Mark 16 verses 19 and 20, and Matthew 28 verses 19 and 20. According to a tradition mentioned by Eusebius, they dispersed to distinct parts of the world. In the Middle Ages, a liturgical feast of the Dispersion of the Apostles was celebrated to commemorate their missionary work and their founding the apostolic sees. This annual feast was held on 15 July and ranked as a major double.

The Acts of the Apostles, the canonical sequel to the Gospel of Luke, portrays the dispersal as occurring a substantial time after the ascension, with the ministry staying in Jerusalem at first and spreading from there beginning with the conversion of the Ethiopian eunuch.

== The dispersion of the Apostles ==
According to Book 3 of the Church History of Eusebius:

Meanwhile the holy apostles and disciples of our Saviour were dispersed throughout the world. Parthia, according to tradition, was allotted to Thomas as his field of labor, Scythia to Andrew, and Asia to John, who, after he had lived some time there, died at Ephesus. Peter appears to have preached in Pontus, Galatia, Bithynia, Cappadocia, and Asia to the Jews of the dispersion. And at last, having come to Rome, he was crucified head-downwards; for he had requested that he might suffer in this way. What do we need to say concerning Paul, who preached the Gospel of Christ from Jerusalem to Illyricum, and afterwards suffered martyrdom in Rome under Nero? These facts are related by Origen in the third volume of his Commentary on Genesis.

Arthur Cushman McGiffert comments:

According to Lipsius, the legends concerning the labors of the apostles in various countries were all originally connected with that of their separation at Jerusalem, which is as old as the second century. But this separation was put at various dates by different traditions, varying from immediately after the Ascension to twenty-four years later. A lost book, referred to by the Decretum Gelasii as Liber qui appellatus sortes Apostolorum apocryphus, very likely contained the original tradition, and an account of the fate of the apostles, and was probably of Gnostic or Manichean origin. The efforts to derive from the varying traditions any trustworthy particulars as to the apostles themselves is almost wholly vain. The various traditions not only assign different fields of labor to the different apostles, but also give different lists of the apostles themselves. See Lipsius’ article on the Apocryphal Acts of the Apostles in Smith and Wace's Dict. of Christ. Biog. I. p. 17 sqq. The extant Apocryphal Gospels, Acts, Apocalypses, &c., are translated in the Ante-Nicene Fathers, Vol. VIII. p. 361 sqq. Lipsius states that, according to the oldest form of the tradition, the apostles were divided into three groups: first, Peter and Andrew, Matthew and Bartholomew, who were said to have preached in the region of the Black Sea; second, Thomas, Thaddeus, and Simeon, the Canaanite, in Parthia; third, John and Philip, in Asia Minor.

Baronius considered that the occasion for this dispersion of the Apostles was the killing of James, son of Zebedee and the departure of Peter "to another place", a view rejected by Friedrich Spanheim.

== Liturgical feast ==
The first vestige of the liturgical feast of the Dispersion of the Apostles appears in the undoubtedly authentic sequence composed for it by a certain Godescalc (d. 1098) while a monk of Limburg on the Haardt; he also introduced this feast at Aachen, while provost of the Church of Our Lady. Godescalc was a follower of Henry IV and it is probable that he introduced this feast in the Church of Our Lady as a means of propaganda against Pope Gregory VII, with whom Henry stood in direct rivalry during the Investiture Controversy.

The feast is next mentioned by William Durandus, Bishop of Mende (Rationale Div. Off. 7.15) in the second half of the 13th century. Under the title, "Dimissio", "Dispersio", or "Divisio Apostolorum" it was celebrated during the Middle Ages in France, Spain, Italy, the Low Countries and also at least in the north of Germany. It is also mentioned in the "Order of Service for the Monastery of St. Gall" dating from 1583 as feast "duplex minus". The object of the feast (so Godescalcus) was to commemorate the departure (dispersion) of the Apostles from Jerusalem to various parts of the world, perhaps some fourteen years after the Ascension of Jesus, presumably following the Great Commission (Mark 16:14–20, Matthew 28:18–20). According to Durandus, some of his contemporaries honoured on this feast of the "Divisio Apostolorum" the (apocryphal) division of the relics (bodies) of St. Peter and St. Paul by St. Sylvester.

In 1909, according to the article by Frederick Holweck published in that year in volume 5 of the Catholic Encyclopedia, the feast was still kept with solemnity by some missionary societies in Germany and Poland, as well in some English and French dioceses and in the United States by the ecclesiastical provinces of St. Louis, Chicago, Milwaukee, Dubuque, and Santa Fé.

The feast was not included in the Tridentine calendar or in any later revision of the General Roman Calendar.

The proper Office for this feast is relegated to the "Pro Aliquibus Locis" or "For Other Places." The feast is celebrated in some places on July 15, titled "The Division of the Apostles" with a rank of Double. The rubric is taken from the Common Office, except the proper Nocturns for Matins, and the following Prayer that is recited throughout that day:

O GOD, Who hast been pleased to bring us to know Thy Name by the means of Thy blessed Apostles, grant us the grace to honor their everlasting glory by our own progress and by the same honoring also to progress. Through our Lord.

== See also ==
- Early centers of Christianity
