= Great Jubilee =

Major event in the Catholic Church commemorating the year 2000

2000 Jubilee
- The official logo of the Great Jubilee of 2000 features its motto with the Latin meaning: Christ Yesterday, Today, Forever.
- Native name: Iubilaeum A.D. 2000
- Date: 24 December 1999 – 6 January 2001
- Duration: 380 days
- Location: Worldwide
- Website: www.vatican.va/jubilee_2000/index.htm

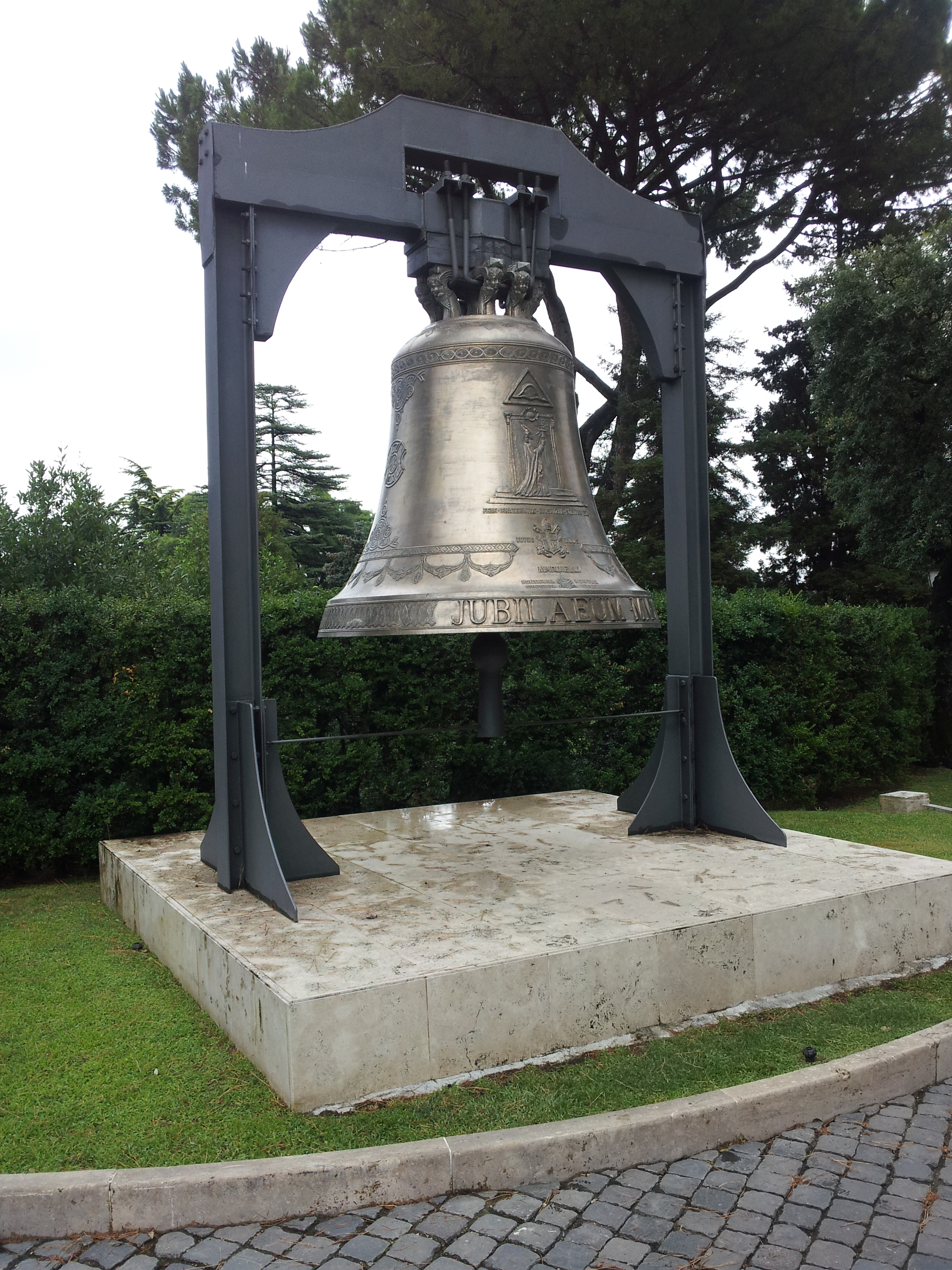
Great bell Jubilee of the year 2000.

The Great Jubilee in 2000 was a major event in the Catholic Church, held from Christmas Eve (24 December) 1999 to Epiphany (6 January) 2001. Like previous Jubilee years, it was a celebration of the mercy of God and forgiveness of sins. The major innovation in this Jubilee was the addition of many "particular Jubilees" for various groups of persons, and that it was simultaneously celebrated in Rome, the Holy Land, and elsewhere in the world.

== Preparations ==
Preparation for the Great Jubilee began when Pope John Paul II issued his Apostolic Letter Tertio Millennio Adveniente (As the Third Millennium Approaches) on 10 November 1994. In the letter, he invited the Church to begin a three-year period of intensive preparation for the celebration of the third Christian millennium. The first year, 1997 would be marked by an exploration of the person of Jesus, the second, 1998, by meditation on the person of the Holy Spirit, and the third, 1999, by meditation on the person of God the Father. Each year was also to be marked by a special prayer of entrustment to the Blessed Virgin Mary.

The formal convocation of the holy year came through the papal bull of indiction, Incarnationis Mysterium (Mystery of the Incarnation), on 29 November 1998. In the bull, the Pope indicated that he had desired to lead the Church into the Great Jubilee since the beginning of his pontificate. He explained that this Jubilee would be a chance to open new horizons in preaching the Kingdom of God. However, it would also be a time of repentance, both for individuals and for the Church as a whole. Furthermore, he stressed the ecumenical character of this event, which he saw as not only for Catholics, but for all Christians and indeed for the whole world.

The various churches and cathedrals in Rome took advantage of the Jubilee to perform long-needed renovations. The facade of St. Peter's was under scaffolding for months, as centuries of grime were painstakingly removed. The Holy See also arranged to build a massive parking garage under the Janiculum hill, in order to accommodate all the buses that were expected. Construction of the garage was halted for some time due to the discovery of mosaics dating from the imperial period in previously unknown chambers under the hill. These were removed en masse so as to be able to complete the garage in time for the Jubilee.

== Jubilee Indulgence ==
With the Bull of Indiction came a document from the Apostolic Penitentiary, indicating the conditions for receiving the Jubilee indulgence. In many respects, they were greatly simplified with respect to previous years. The normal conditions of confession, communion, prayer for the Pope and renunciation of attachment to sin remained in place, but unlike previous Jubilees, it was only necessary to visit a single church on a single day.

The indulgence could be obtained in Rome by visiting one of the four patriarchal basilicas, St. Peter's Basilica, St. John Lateran, St. Paul Outside the Walls or St. Mary Major, as well as by a visit to the shrine of Our Lady of Divine Love, the basilica of St. Lawrence Outside the Walls or the Christian catacombs of Rome. In the visit, the pilgrim had to take part in a religious celebration or spend a half-hour in Eucharistic adoration.

The indulgence could also be obtained in the Holy Land by a visit to the Church of the Holy Sepulchre in Jerusalem, the Church of the Nativity in Bethlehem, or the Church of the Annunciation in Nazareth.

Further, the Jubilee was extended to all dioceses of the world. A visit to the cathedral church or another shrine designated by the bishop would also suffice to gain the Jubilee indulgence. Cloistered nuns and monks could obtain the indulgence in their house chapels.

Finally, the indulgence could be gained by means of a personal sacrifice or works of charity. Specifically mentioned in the document were sacrifices such as giving up smoking or alcohol for at least one day or making a donation to help the poor.

== Highpoints ==
The particular Jubilees punctuated each week of the year 2000. There were special Vespers services held every day at St. Peter's Basilica, often with participation by the Pope. Nearly every Sunday was dedicated to a special celebration of some sector of society. (See list at the end of this article.)

Some events of the Jubilee year were seen to be particularly significant, however.

=== Opening ===
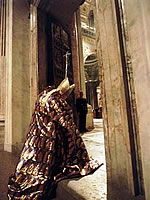
Pope John Paul II kneels on the threshold of the holy door of St. Peter's Basilica. 24 December 1999

The pope opened the Jubilee by opening the holy door of St. Peter's Basilica shortly before the Midnight Mass on 24 December 1999. Most of the time, the holy doors of the patriarchal Basilicas are cemented shut. On the occasion of a Jubilee year, the pope opens the doors as a symbol of opening the doors of grace. Pilgrims visiting the basilicas to gain the Jubilee indulgence enter the basilicas through these special doors. Throughout most of the Jubilee year, long lines were queued up to enter the door.

Pope John Paul II simplified the rite of opening considerably, compared to previous Jubilees. (See Holy door.) After a series of prayers and hymns, punctuated by African elephant tusks being blown, the Pope, clad in a purple cope, pushed on the doors as they were drawn open from inside by assistants. He then fell to his knees on the threshold of the Basilica and prayed, holding his silver Papal ferula. Pope John Paul II commissioned Patsy Ford Simms to compose the music for this celebration.

The holy door in St. John Lateran was opened by the pope the following day, and that of St. Mary Major on 1 January 2000.

=== Ecumenical celebration at St. Paul's ===
The fourth holy door, that of St. Paul Outside the Walls, was not opened until 18 January 2000, to launch the week of prayer for Christian Unity. For that celebration, the Pope had planned an ecumenical service, inviting leaders of all Christian religions to take part. Twenty-two Christian leaders accepted the invitation, along with a representative of the World Council of Churches, which represents 337 denominations. The opening of the door was carried out simultaneously by the Pope, Metropolitan Athanasias, representing the Ecumenical Patriarch, and George Carey, Archbishop of Canterbury. All three fell to their knees on the threshold of the Basilica, joined in prayer. The liturgy of the day included readings from the Bible, from the Lutheran martyr Dietrich Bonhoeffer and from the Russian theologian Georges Florovsky.

=== Prayer for forgiveness for sins of the Church ===
One particularly rich ceremony of the Jubilee, dubbed the "Day of Forgiveness", came on 12 March 2000, the first Sunday of Lent. There the Pope begged forgiveness from God for the sins committed by members of the Church, and particularly sins committed in the name of the Church.

Seven senior curial officials read special prayers asking for forgiveness in specific areas. The first, Benin's Cardinal Bernardin Gantin, then dean of the College of Cardinals, made a general confession of Christians' sins in the course of history. Joseph Ratzinger, cardinal prefect of the Congregation for the Doctrine of the Faith, called for confession of faults for the use of "non-evangelical methods" in the service of faith, as for example, in the Inquisition. Roger Etchegaray, cardinal president of the Central Committee for the Jubilee, exhorted the confession of sins that caused division among Christians; Cardinal Edward Idris Cassidy, president of the Pontifical Council for Promoting Christian Unity, acknowledged the faults committed "against the people of the Covenant," the Jews; and Japanese Archbishop Stephen Fumio Hamao, president of the Pontifical Council for the Pastoral Care of Migrants and Itinerant People, mentioned sins committed against love, peace, the rights of peoples, respect of cultures and religions. Nigerian Cardinal Francis Arinze, president of the Pontifical Council for Interreligious Dialogue, requested confession of sins that have wounded the dignity of woman and the unity of mankind. Finally, Vietnamese Archbishop François Xavier Nguyên Van Thuân, president of the Pontifical Council for Justice and Peace, encouraged confession of sins in the area of fundamental rights of the human person: abuses against children, marginalisation of the poor, suppression of the unborn in the maternal womb or their use for experimentation.

This mea culpa of the Church was widely applauded, but some members of the Catholic Church felt that it had gone too far, and had damaged the doctrine that the Church is holy. For his part, at the prayer of the Angelus later in the day, the Pope indicated that such a ceremony was necessary. "The Holy Year is a time of purification: the Church is Holy because Christ is her Head and Spouse, the Spirit is her vivifying soul, and the Blessed Virgin and the saints are her most authentic expression. However, the children of the Church know the reality of sin, whose shadows are reflected in her, darkening her beauty. Because of this, the Church does not cease to implore God's forgiveness for the sins of her members."

=== Pilgrimage to the Holy Land ===
Only a few days later, from 21 March to 26 March, the Pope realized a long-held dream by completing a personal pilgrimage to the Holy Land. He visited Jordan, Israel and lands held by the Palestinian Authority. Two particular high points of that visit were his prayer at the Western Wall, where he placed a copy of the prayer for forgiveness for sins against the Jews into a crack in the wall, and his celebration of the Mass in the Cenacle in Jerusalem.

The Cenacle had been closed to Pope Paul VI when he visited Jerusalem in 1964, because the same site is venerated in Judaism as the burial site of King David. Pope John Paul II was permitted to celebrate in this most holy location of Christianity, where he preached on the words spoken by the faithful after the consecration: "Christ has died, Christ has risen, Christ will come again". After the visit, the Israeli government arranged for the possession of the cenacle to be transferred to the Catholic Church in exchange for Santa María Blanca, a synagogue in Toledo, Spain that had been converted into a church.

Pope John Paul II presides at the Vespers service during World Youth Day, 2000.

=== World Youth Day ===
World Youth Day 2000 was an extremely well-attended event. An estimated two million youths took place in the closing Mass. The Roman subways were filled with singing youths from all over the world. The area around the Circus Maximus was converted into a large area for the hearing of confession. There were always long lines at these confessionals, and most priests in Rome spent several hours here. The event culminated with the Mass on 20 August 2000 in a large field belonging to the Roman university Tor Vergata.

=== Closing ===
The Great Jubilee was closed on 6 January 2001 with the Mass of Epiphany. On the previous night, the Basilica of St. Peter was scheduled to close at 6:00 p.m. but the church remained open until the last pilgrim had passed through the Holy Doors at about 2:20 a.m. on 6 January. After solemnly closing the Holy Door, the Pope celebrated Mass in front of the basilica for a congregation of some 10,000 persons. On this occasion, the Pope signed his Apostolic Letter Novo Millennio Ineunte (At the beginning of the new millennium) which outlines the priorities of the Church for the 21st century and beyond.

== The Jubilee beyond the Catholic Church ==
The proposal to celebrate the year 2000 was received very well among Christians. Early on, the Vatican had a disappointment because the Waldenses, the only large Protestant religion in Italy, refused to participate because of their dispute against the Jubilee indulgence. Nonetheless, many Christians celebrated this year in a special way.

There were also various special efforts to bring light on social issues in this year. Noting that the Biblical Jubilees involved the forgiveness of debts, the rock singer Bono, Quincy Jones, Willie Colón, Muhammad Ali, Bob Geldof among others supported Jubilee 2000 to increase awareness of the developing nations struggling under a possibly unpayable foreign debt. With the blessing of the Pope, they sought to bring governments and international banks to cancel such debts during the Jubilee year.

The Italian group, Hands Off Cain (Nessuno tocchi Caino), took advantage of the Jubilee to call for an end to capital punishment around the world. Whenever a country chose to commute a sentence or abolish the death penalty entirely, the group illuminated the Roman Colosseum for various numbers of days. The Pope also called for a moratorium on executions and, if possible, the abolishment of the practice. On 9 July 2000, he visited the Regina Coeli prison in Rome.

== Events ==
=== Holy Doors ===
Opening and closing of the Holy Doors of the four major papal basilicas in Rome signal the beginning and end of the jubilee:

Basilica	Opening date	Closing date	Image
St. Peter's Basilica in the Vatican	24 December 1999	6 January 2001	
St. John Lateran Basilica	25 December 1999	5 January 2001	
Basilica of Saint Mary Major	1 January 2000	5 January 2001	
Basilica of Saint Paul Outside the Walls	18 January 2000	5 January 2001	

=== List of Jubilee events presided by John Paul II ===
- 1999
  - 24 December: Opening of the Holy Door, Basilica of St. Peter
  - 25 December: Opening of the Holy Door, Basilica of St. John Lateran
- 2000
  - 1 January: Opening of the Holy Door, Basilica of St. Mary Major
  - 18 January: Opening of the Holy Door, Basilica of St. Paul Outside the Walls
  - 2 February: Jubilee of Consecrated Life
  - 11 February: Jubilee of the Sick and health care workers
  - 18 February: Jubilee of Artists
  - 19 February: Jubilee of Permanent Deacons
  - 22 February: Jubilee of the Roman Curia
  - 12 March: Day of Forgiveness
  - 19 March: Jubilee of Artisans
  - 16 April: Palm Sunday
  - 23 April: Easter Sunday
  - 1 May: Jubilee of workers
  - 7 May: Commemoration of witnesses of the 20th century
  - 18 May: Jubilee of priests
  - 25 May: Jubilee of Scientists
  - 28 May: Jubilee of Diocese of Rome
  - 2 June: Jubilee of Migrants
  - 4 June: Jubilee of Journalists
  - 18–25 June: International Eucharistic Congress
  - 22 June: Solemnity Corpus Christi
  - 9 July: Jubilee in Prisons
  - 15–20 August: World Youth Day
  - 11 September: Jubilee of University World
  - 15 September: Jubilee of Apostolic Nuncios
  - 17 September: Jubilee of Senior Citizens
  - 7–8 October Jubilee of Bishops
  - 14–15 October: Jubilee of Families
  - 22 October: World Mission Sunday
  - 29 October: Jubilee of the World of Sports
  - 1 November: 50th Anniversary of the dogma of the Assumption of Mary
  - 5 November: Jubilee of Statesmen and Politicians
  - 12 November: Jubilee of Agricultural World
  - 19 November: Jubilee of Armed Forces and Police
  - 26 November: Jubilee of the Apostolate of the Laity
  - 3 December: Jubilee of Communities with persons with a disability
  - 10 December: Jubilee of Catechists and Teachers of religion
  - 17 December: Jubilee of the Entertainment World
- 2001
  - 6 January 2001: Closing of Holy Door at St. Peter's Basilica

== Other events ==
Arvo Pärt was commissioned to compose a work for the occasion, and wrote Cecilia, vergine romana (Cecilia, Roman virgin) for mixed choir and orchestra. The Italian text deals with the life and martyrdom of Saint Cecilia, the patron saint of music. The work was first performed on 19 November 2000, close to her feast day on 22 November, by the Accademia Nazionale di Santa Cecilia conducted by Myung-whun Chung.

== See also ==
- Tertio Millennio Adveniente
- Novo Millennio Ineunte
- "Jubilee Song", an English-language Filipino song written to coincide with the Great Jubilee
- New evangelization
