= Cecilia, vergine romana =

Composition for mixed choir and orchestra by Estonian composer Arvo Pärt

- Choral music by Arvo Pärt
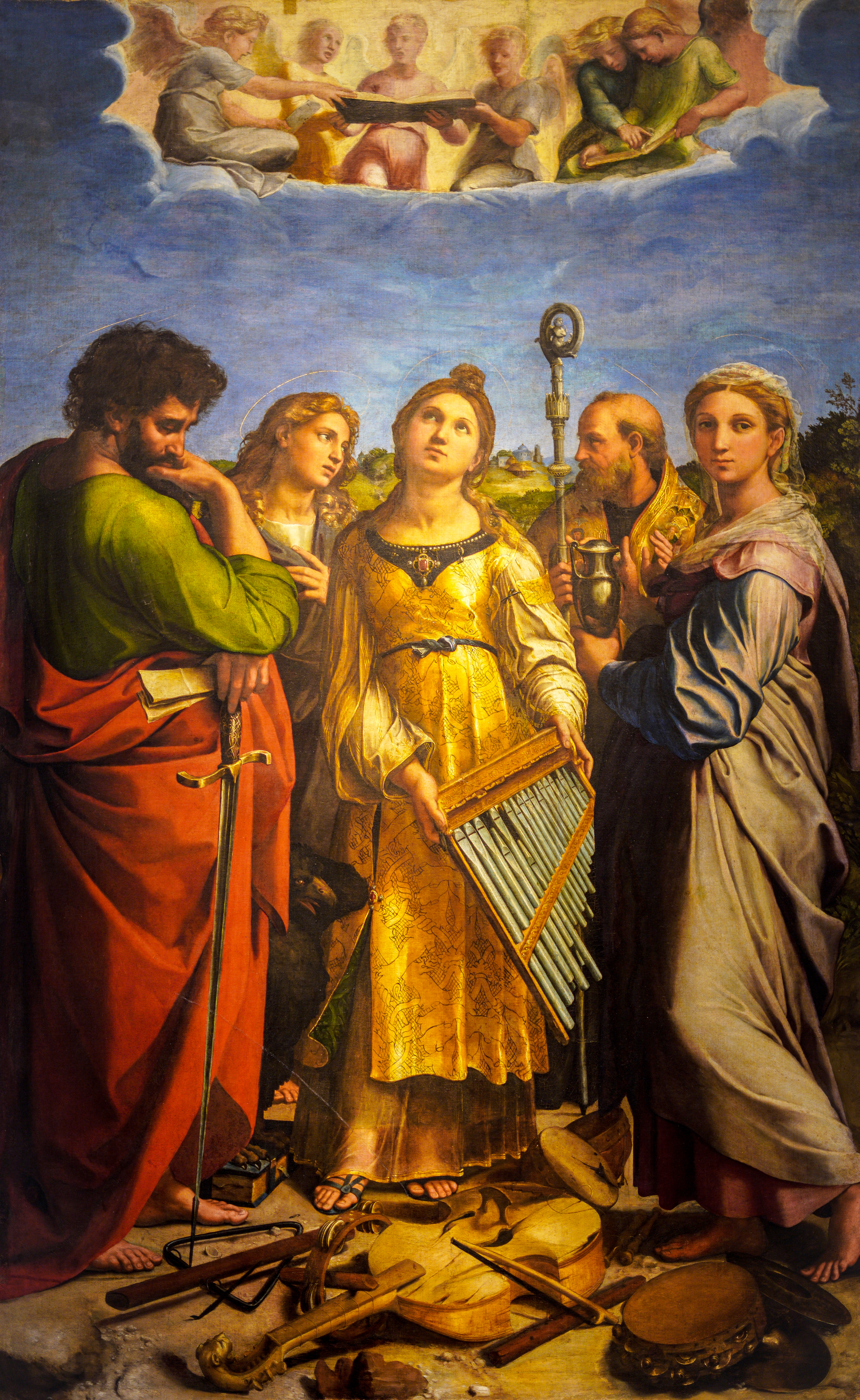
- Saint Cecilia by Raphael
- Occasion: Great Jubilee
- Text: from a breviary
- Language: Italian
- Composed: 2000
- Dedication: Myung-whun Chung and Accademia Nazionale di Santa Cecilia
- Performed: 19 November 2000: Rome
- Scoring: SATB choir; orchestra

Cecilia, vergine romana (Cecilia, Roman virgin) is a composition for mixed choir and orchestra by Estonian composer Arvo Pärt, written in 2000 for the Great Jubilee in Rome. The Italian text deals with the life and martyrdom of Saint Cecilia, the patron saint of music, and was first performed on 19 November 2000, close to her feast day on 22 November, by the Accademia Nazionale di Santa Cecilia conducted by Myung-whun Chung.

== History ==
The composition was commissioned by the Agenzia Romana per la preparazione del Giubileo of Rome in Italy for the millennium celebrations, the Great Jubilee. Pärt dedicated it to the conductor Myung-whun Chung and to the choir and orchestra of the Accademia Nazionale di Santa Cecilia, who performed the premiere on 19 November 2000 in Rome, close to the feast of the saint on 22 November. It was published by Universal Edition.

== Text and music ==
Pärt searched for a text to commemorate the martyrdom of Saint Cecilia, the patron saint of music, beginning in 1999. He found a Latin text at the Graz seminary in the Breviarium Romanum, containing a short description of her life. A historic translation to Italian was found at the Monastero di Bose.

Cecilia, vergine romana is set in a single movement, and takes about 17 minutes to perform. It is scored for a four-part choir (SATB), two flutes, two oboes, two clarinets, two bassoons, four horns, two trumpets, two trombones, tuba, percussion (two players), harp, and strings.

== Recording ==
The composition was recorded, together with other works by Pärt, titled In principio, by the Estonian Philharmonic Chamber Choir conducted by Tõnu Kaljuste at ECM Records in 2009. The collection also includes Da pacem Domine, among others. It was recorded with other works by Pärt by the choir and orchestra of Bayerischer Rundfunk, conducted by Ulf Schirmer.
