= Patsy Ford Simms =

American composer (born 1946)

- Born: October 9, 1946
- Died: October 6, 2026 (aged 79)
- Genres: Choral music, Gospel music
- Occupations: Composer, arranger, educator

Patsy Ford Simms (October 9, 1946 - October 6, 2026) was an American composer, arranger, and educator who was widely published in both the secular and religious fields.

== Career ==
Patsy Ford Simms began composing in 1981 at the age of 35 as a matter of necessity, being a music teacher in American middle schools, due to a lack of choral octavos to teach to her students. She was inspired and encouraged by the late Joyce Eilers (creator of the 3 part mixed concept) who was her mentor. Simms taught grades K-12 for 34 years, primarily in the Jefferson County Public Schools and the Youth Performing Arts School in Louisville, Kentucky.

Her extensive work over more than three decades has earned her international recognition and renown, particularly in Europe, Africa, and Bermuda, where she has been a presenter.

Two of Patsy's most notable compositions are "Amani Utupe", written in English and Swahili for Kenyan friends of hers, and “Climbin’ up the Mountain.” Both were selected for two MENC (Music Educators National Conference) World’s Largest Concerts.

In 2000, Simms received numerous international honors. The International Adkins Chiti: Women in Music Foundation featured Simms as an outstanding African-American Woman Composer. She was invited to perform music by Margaret Bonds in Rome as well as to accompany soprano Eleanor McClellan on several songs composed by Florence Price. Pope John Paul II commissioned Patsy to compose "Virgin Mary," the official music for the opening ceremony of the Great Jubilee in the Vatican, performed with McClellan as vocalist.

Simms' compositions and arrangements are archived at the Center for Black Music Research (Chicago, Illinois) and at the Donne in Musica Foundation (Rome, Italy).

== Personal life ==
Patsy is married to retired Presbyterian minister Dr. Otis Turner. They live in Jacksonville, Florida and have three adult sons who have children of their own. She has degrees from Knoxville College, University of Louisville, and Columbia Pacific University.
