= The Way (Escrivá book) =

1934 book by Josemaría Escrivá

The Way (Spanish: Camino) is a book about spirituality composed by Josemaría Escrivá, the initiator of the Roman Catholic religious organization Opus Dei. The book was published first during 1934 with the name Consideraciones espirituales. It received its present title during 1939. More than four and a half million copies have been sold, in 43 languages.

According to Escrivá his motivation was: "The 999 points which make up The Way were written with yearnings to see 'Christ, the Light of the World.' Anyone who reads it with the same yearnings will not have opened this book in vain."

The Way was composed based on notes Escrivá made based on his thoughts about the gospel and its application to specific situations occurring during his personal pastoral experience. Many of the sections are counsels he actually gave to persons in spiritual direction. Some are letters he wrote and received. Thus it has a conversational style. As a reviewer in the Vatican newspaper Osservatore Romano (March 24, 1950) stated: "Msgr. Escrivá de Balaguer has written something more than a masterpiece; he has written straight from the heart, and straight to the heart go the short paragraphs which make up The Way." The writer on the Spanish Catholic world, Frances Lannon, has described it as "a bizarre amalgam of traditional piety, penitential discipline, and crude popular moralizing; it aims at a fusion of devotion with efficiency, inward humility with the exercise of leadership and power. Its readers are exhorted to childlike simplicity, to silence and discretion, and to orderliness; they are encouraged to pray to guardian angels and to the souls in purgatory, and to bless themselves every day with holy water. But they are also urged to acquire professional competence, to stand out from the crowd, to lead and to dominate."

== Sources ==
- Pedro Rodríguez (theologian), Critical edition of The Way.
