= Evangelii nuntiandi =

1975 apostolic exhortation by Pope Paul VI

Evangelii nuntiandi Latin for 'Evangelization in the Modern World' Apostolic exhortation of Pope Paul VI
- Signature date: 8 December 1975
- Number: 12 of 12 of the pontificate
- Text: In Latin; In English

Evangelii nuntiandi (Evangelization in the Modern World; abbreviation: EN) is an apostolic exhortation issued on 8 December 1975 by Pope Paul VI on the theme of Catholic evangelization. The title, taken from the opening words of the original Latin text, means "in proclaiming the Gospel". It affirms the role of every Christian, not only ordained ministers, priests, and deacons, or religious, or professional church staff, in spreading the Gospel of Jesus Christ.

Paul VI convened a synod to meet in September 1974 to define what Catholics mean by "evangelization." The exhortation, which appeared in late 1975, reflects the work of that synod. The term, although ancient, was and is ambiguous for many. Evangelii nuntiandi gave theological principles to guide members in understanding what is meant by the word evangelization and how it applies to the average Roman Catholic. In doing so, the document emphasized that the modern world emphasized images more than words. As such, the world needs to see witnesses of a new possible way of living in order to be introduced to the Gospel.

At the time of the synod, Cardinal Karol Wojtyla, the Archbishop of Kraków and future Pope John Paul II, was consultor to the Pontifical Council for the Laity. He acted as the synod's general rapporteur or recording secretary and participated extensively in the original drafting of Evangelii nuntiandi.

== Content ==
The exhortation has an introduction followed by seven sections. The introduction articulates evangelization as the Church's primary service. The first section highlights the connection between Christ the evangelizer and his Church which imitates his example. In the second section, Paul VI and the Synod of Bishops propose a definition of evangelization in contrast to all of the other possible conceptions of the term. The third section explains the content of evangelization. The fourth describes the methods of evangelization. The fifth denotes the beneficiaries of evangelization while the sixth section clarifies who the workers in evangelization are. The seventh, and last, section considers the Spirit of evangelization.

== Relation to the New Evangelization ==
Evangelii Nuntiandi is often cited as a source for the New Evangelization of the Catholic Church, which was described by Pope John Paul II as a call for each person to deepen one's faith in God, believe in the Gospel's message, and proclaim the Good News. The focus of the New Evangelization calls all to be evangelized and then go forth to evangelize others. It is focused on re-proposing the Gospel to those who have experienced a crisis of faith. According to a 2008 Center for Applied Research in the Apostolate study, only 23% of U.S. Catholics regularly attend Mass once a week, while 77% self-identify as proud to be Catholic.

== Pope Francis on Evangelii nuntiandi ==
Pope Francis referred to Evangelii nuntiandi as "the greatest pastoral document written to date" and has directed reading and re-reading of EN among bishops and cardinals. His first apostolic exhortation, Evangelii gaudium, quoted Evangelii nuntiandi in a section on popular piety.

== See also ==
- Ad gentes
- Redemptoris missio
