= Matthew 28:20 =

- ← 28:19 Mark 1:1 →
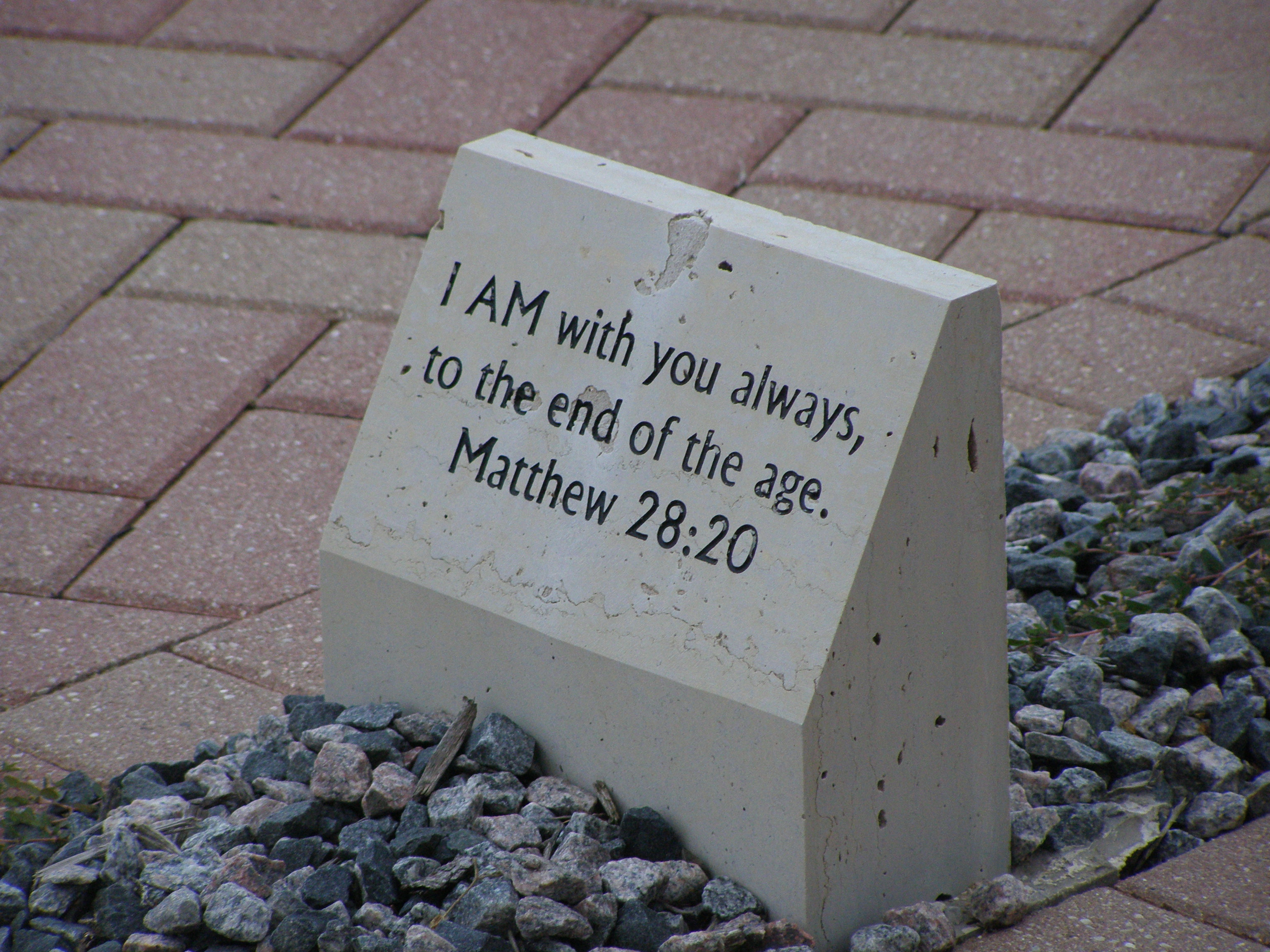
- Matthew 28:20 engraving in the Resurrection's labyrinth, east of the Valparaiso University Chapel of the Resurrection (2009).
- Book: Gospel of Matthew
- Christian Bible part: New Testament

Matthew 28:20 is the twentieth and final verse of Matthew 28, the twenty-eighth and final chapter of the Gospel of Matthew in the New Testament. This verse is part of the Great Commission narrative.

== Content ==
The original Koine Greek, according to the Textus Receptus and Byzantine/Majority Text, reads as follows:

20: διδάσκοντες αὐτοὺς τηρεῖν πάντα ὅσα ἐνετειλάμην ὑμῖν· καὶ ἰδού, ἐγὼ μεθ' ὑμῶν εἰμι πάσας τὰς ἡμέρας ἕως τῆς συντελείας τοῦ αἰῶνος Ἀμήν (Note: Westcott and Hort/[NA27 and UBS4 variants] omits Ἀμήν.)

In the King James Version of the Bible it is translated as:

20: Teaching them to observe all things whatsoever I have commanded you: and, lo, I am with you always, even unto the end of the world. Amen.

The modern World English Bible translates the passage as:

20: teaching them to observe all things that I commanded you. Behold, I am with you always, even to the end of the age." Amen. (Note: According to the BibleGateway website, the World English Bible is based on the American Standard Version, first published in 1901, the Biblia Hebraica Stutgartensa Old Testament, and the Greek Majority Text New Testament. It is in draft form, and currently being edited for accuracy and readability.) (Note: For a collection of other versions see BibleHub: Matthew 28:20)

== Analysis ==
The word "all" (Ancient Greek: πάντα; πάσας, panta; pasas) are found multiple times in the verses 18–20, tying them together: all power/authority, all nations, all things ("that I have commanded you") and all the days ("always").

Dale Allison notes a persistent correlation of the Great Commission narrative (verses 16–20) with Moses, starting with "the mountain", as 'Moses ended his earthly course on a mountain'; the commissioning of Joshua by God through Moses; and the close parallels in Deuteronomy 31:14–15, 23; and Joshua 1:1–9, which are 'all about God'. In Joshua 1:2, Joshua was commanded to 'go' (cf. Matthew 28:19) and cross the Jordan River, whereas in Joshua 1:7 Joshua was to 'act in accordance with all the law that my servant Moses commanded you', then in Joshua 1:9 (the pericope's conclusion) God promises his presence: 'for the Lord your God is with you wherever you go'. The undeniable strong presence of a Moses typology in the Gospel Matthew rises up suggestions that this passage, like the commissioning stories in 1 Chronicles 22:1–16 and Jeremiah 1:1–10, 'deliberately borrows from the traditions about Moses'. Just as Moses, at the end of his life on earth, commissioned Joshua to 'go into the land peopled by foreign nations' and 'to observe all the commandments in the law', then further promised 'God's abiding presence', so similarly is Jesus at the end of his earthly ministry commands his disciples 'to go into all nations' (the world) and 'to teach the observance of all the commandments' of the "new Moses", and then further promises 'his continual assisting presence'.

Matthew's narrative up to this point portrays Jesus as "teacher", but here the verb "teach" is linked to the disciples as the subject, but they are to teach "what Jesus has commanded" (Greek: entellomai), not their own ideas. The "commandments" given by Jesus is to be the basis of living for the believers, in comparison to the "commandments" (cognate Greek noun: entolē) given by God through Moses (cf. Matthew 5:19; 15:3; 19:17; 22:36–40).

"I am with you always" forms an inclusio with the Isaiah's prophecy quoted in Matthew 1:23 that 'they shall name him "Emmanuel", which means, God is with us' (cf. Matthew 18:20, but also contrast Matthew 26:11: "For you always have the poor with you, but you will not always have me").

The phrase "the end of the age" (or "the end of the world") recurs in Matthew 13:39,40,49; 24:3, and points to Jesus' teachings about the end of times.

== Uses ==
The irmos of the ninth ode of the Paschal Canon in the Orthodox Church, which is sung during Pascha and subsequent Matins services, references Matthew 28:20:

How noble, O how dear,

How sweet is Thy voice, O Christ.

Thou hast promised to be with us

To the end of all ages.

A promise to which we believers hold,

A promise we hold as an anchor of hope,

As we sing, rejoicing [emphasis added].

This hymnological stanza (entitled "Shine, shine", Greek: "Φωτίζου, φωτίζου") originated from the writings of St. John Damascene.

== Sources ==
- Allison, Dale C. Jr. (2007). "57. Matthew". In Barton, John; Muddiman, John (eds.). The Oxford Bible Commentary (first (paperback) ed.). Oxford University Press. ISBN 978-0199277186.
- Coogan, Michael David (2007). Coogan, Michael David; Brettler, Marc Zvi; Newsom, Carol Ann; Perkins, Pheme (eds.). The New Oxford Annotated Bible with the Apocryphal/Deuterocanonical Books: New Revised Standard Version, Issue 48 (Augmented 3rd ed.). Oxford University Press. ISBN 9780195288810.

Preceded by Matthew 28:19	Gospel of Matthew; Chapter 28	Succeeded by Mark 1:1
