= Novo millennio ineunte =

2001 Apostolic Letter by John Paul II

Novo millennio ineunte Latin for 'At the beginning of the new millennium' Apostolic letter of Pope John Paul II
- Signature date: 6 January 2001
- Subject: the priorities for the Catholic Church for the third millennium and beyond.
- Text: In Latin; In English

Novo millennio ineunte (At the beginning of the new millennium) is an apostolic letter of Pope John Paul II, addressed to the Bishops Clergy and Lay Faithful, "At the Close of the Great Jubilee of 2000".

The apostolic letter outlines the priorities for the Catholic Church for the third millennium and beyond.

== Put out into the deep ==
The opening paragraph cites Jesus inviting the Apostle Simon Peter to "put out into the deep" for a catch: "Duc in altum" (Lk 5:4). This phrase was often repeated by Pope John Paul II and quoted by others. Peter and his companions trusted Christ's words, and cast the nets. "When they had done this, they caught a great number of fish" (Lk 5:6).

== Christ at the Center ==
Understood in his divine and human mystery, Christ is the foundation and centre of history, he is its meaning and ultimate goal.... His incarnation, culminating in the Paschal Mystery and the gift of the Spirit, is the pulsating heart of time, the mysterious hour in which the Kingdom of God came to us (cf. Mk 1:15), indeed took root in our history, as the seed destined to become a great tree (cf. Mk 4:30–32).

The program already exists: it is the plan found in the Gospel and in the living Tradition, it is the same as ever. Ultimately, it has its center in Christ himself, who is to be known, loved and imitated, so that in him we may live the life of the Trinity, and with him transform history until its fulfilment in the heavenly Jerusalem. This is a program which does not change with shifts of times and cultures, even though it takes account of time and culture for the sake of true dialogue and effective communication. This program for all times is our program for the Third Millennium.

== Priorities ==
The highest priority is put on holiness or sanctity: "All Christian faithful ... are called to the fullness of the Christian life." (no. 30)

The second priority is the basic means to arrive at holiness: "This training in holiness calls for a Christian life distinguished above all in the art of prayer." (no. 32)

Another priority is the New Evangelization: "Over the years, I have often repeated the summons to the new evangelization. I do so again now, especially in order to insist that we must rekindle in ourselves the impetus of the beginnings and allow ourselves to be filled with the ardour of the apostolic preaching which followed Pentecost. We must revive in ourselves the burning conviction of Paul, who cried out: 'Woe to me if I do not preach the Gospel' (1 Corinthians 9:16)." (no. 40)

== Vatican II documents in the third millennium ==
"With the passing of the years, the Second Vatican Council documents have lost nothing of their value or brilliance. They need to be read correctly, to be widely known and taken to heart as important and normative texts of the Magisterium, within the Church's Tradition. Now that the Jubilee has ended, I feel more than ever in duty bound to point to the Council as the great grace bestowed on the Church in the twentieth century: there we find a sure compass by which to take our bearings in the century now beginning." (no. 57)

== See also ==
- Lumen gentium
- Tertio millennio adveniente
- Universal call to holiness
- 3rd millennium
