= Tertio millennio adveniente =

1994 letter from Pope John Paul II

John Paul II's coat of arms

Tertio millennio adveniente (Latin for 'As the third millennium approaches') is an apostolic letter of Pope John Paul II, promulgated on 10 November 1994, concerning preparation for the Great Jubilee of the Year 2000.

In the letter, the pope addressed bishops, priests, deacons, religious and all the faithful.

The document consists of five chapters:

1. Jesus Christ yesterday and today (Hebrews 13,8)
2. Jubilee of the Year 2000
3. Preparation of the Great Jubilee
4. Direct preparation
5. Jesus Christ is the same for ever (Heb 13,8)

Regarding direct preparation, John Paul II specified three phases. The first phase was an ante-preparation phase in which to revive in the Christian people an awareness of the value and meaning of the Jubilee of the Year 2000 in human history. The second phase was to be characterized by a Trinitarian reflection upon Jesus Christ, the Holy Spirit and God the Father. Preparation would include an examination of conscience. The third phase would the celebration of the year 2000 itself.

The celebration of the Great Jubilee was planned to take place in the Holy Land, in Rome and in all the local Churches throughout the world.

== See also ==
- Jubilee (Christianity)
- Novo Millennio Ineunte
