= Redemptoris missio =

1990 encyclical by Pope John Paul II, concerning the Gospel and pastoral care

Redemptoris missio Latin for 'The Mission of the Redeemer' Encyclical of Pope John Paul II
- Signature date: 7 December 1990
- Subject: On the permanent validity of the Church's missionary mandate
- Number: 8 of 14 of the pontificate
- Text: In Latin; In English

Redemptoris missio (Latin for The Mission of the Redeemer), subtitled On the permanent validity of the Church's missionary mandate, is an encyclical by Pope John Paul II published on 7 December 1990. The release coincided with the twenty-fifth anniversary of Vatican II's Decree on the Church's Missionary Activity, Ad gentes. It is devoted to the subject of "the urgency of missionary activity" and in it the pope wished "to invite the Church to renew her missionary commitment."

The encyclical differentiated three spheres of evangelization (Para 33-34):

- Missio ad gentes, directed to people who do not yet believe in Christ
- Reevangelization, aimed at rekindling Christian faith
- Pastoral care, the deeper insertion of the gospel in the hearts and minds of faithful Christians

== Context ==
The encyclical is an important elaboration on the theme of New Evangelization cited often by Pope John Paul II. The most striking part of the document is the fourth chapter where the Pope details what is involved in the mission Ad gentes to the non-Christian world. The encyclical is a successor to Vatican II documents including Lumen gentium and Ad gentes. It is a successor to Pope Paul VI's document on evangelism, Evangelii nuntiandi, and is a predecessor to Pope Francis' Evangelii gaudium.

== Table of contents ==
=== Blessing ===
John Paul II opens the encyclical with the words:

Venerable Brothers, Beloved Sons and Daughters,
Health and the Apostolic Blessing!

=== Introduction (1-3) ===
In the introduction John Paul II expresses what he perceives to be as the urgency of evangelism.

- "I sense that the moment has come to commit all of the Church’s energies to a new evangelization and to the mission ad gentes. No believer in Christ, no institution of the Church can avoid this supreme duty: to proclaim Christ to all peoples." (Para. 3)
- "For in the Church’s history, missionary drive has always been a sign of vitality, just as its lessening is a sign of a crisis of faith.

=== I. Jesus Christ, the Only Savior (4-11) ===
- "Christ is the one Savior of all, the only one able to reveal God and lead to God." (#5.1)

=== II. The Kingdom of God (12-20) ===
- "The Kingdom of God is not a concept, a doctrine, or a program subject to free interpretation, but it is before all else a person with the face and name of Jesus of Nazareth, the image of the invisible God." (#18.2)

=== III. The Holy Spirit, the Principal Agent of Mission (21-30) ===
- "The Holy Spirit is indeed the principal agent of the whole of the Church's mission..as can be clearly seen in the early Church: in the conversion of Cornelius (cf. Acts 10), in the decisions made about emerging problems (cf. Acts 15) and in the choice of regions and peoples to be evangelized (cf Acts 16:6 ff) (Para 21)
- "Today the Church must face other challenges and push forward to new frontiers, both in the initial mission ad gentes and in the new evangelization of those peoples who have already heard Christ proclaimed." (Para 30)

=== IV. The Vast Horizons of the Mission Ad Gentes (31-40) ===
The Church proposes...

The Church proposes; she imposes nothing. - Redemptoris missio §39

- "The Lord Jesus sent his apostles to every person, people and place on earth."(Para. 31)
- "Internal and external difficulties must not make us pessimistic or inactive. What counts, here as in every area of Christian life, is the confidence that comes from faith, from the certainty that it is not we who are the principal agents of the Church’s mission, but Jesus Christ and his Spirit." (Para. 36)
- "It is to be hoped that authentic religious freedom will be granted to all people everywhere...On her part. the Church addresses people with full respect for their freedom. Her mission does not restrict freedom but rather promotes it. The Church proposes; she imposes nothing. She respects individuals and cultures, and she honors the sanctuary of conscience. To those who for various reasons oppose missionary activity, the Church repeats: Open the doors to Christ!" (Para. 39)

=== V. The Paths of Mission (41-60) ===
- “The witness of a Christian life is the first and irreplaceable form of mission” (RMis 42)
- "The Church is called to bear witness to Christ by taking courageous and prophetic stands in the face of the corruption of political or economic power; by not seeking her own glory and material wealth; by using her resources to serve the poorest of the poor and by imitating Christ’s own simplicity of life. The Church and her missionaries must also bear the witness of humility..."
- "The proclamation of the Word of God has Christian conversion as its aim: a complete and sincere adherence to Christ and his Gospel through faith. Conversion is a gift of God, a work of the Blessed Trinity."

=== VI. Leaders and Workers in the Missionary Apostolate (61-76) ===
- "What was done at the beginning of Christianity to further its universal mission remains valid and urgent today. The Church is missionary by her very nature, for Christ’s mandate is not something contingent or external, but reaches the very heart of the Church." §62
- "Each bishop too, as the pastor of a particular church, has a wide-ranging missionary duty. It falls to him “as the ruler and center of unity in the diocesan apostolate, to promote missionary activity, to direct and coordinate it.… Let him also see to it that apostolic activity is not limited only to those who are already converted, but that a fair share both of personnel and funds be devoted to the evangelization of non-Christians.”" (Para 63)

=== VII. Cooperation in Missionary Activity (77-86) ===
- "I ask young people themselves to listen to Christ’s words as he says to them what he once said to Simon Peter and to Andrew at the lakeside: 'Follow me, and I will make you fishers of men' (Mt 4:19). May they have the courage to reply as Isaiah did: 'Here am I, Lord! I am ready! Send me!' (cf. Is 6:8) They will have a wonderful life ahead of them, and they will know the genuine joy of proclaiming the 'Good News' to brothers and sisters whom they will lead on the way of salvation." (Para. 80)

=== VIII. Missionary Spirituality (87-91) ===
- "An essential characteristic of missionary spirituality is intimate communion with Christ." (Para. 88)
- "The missionary is urged on by “zeal for souls,” a zeal inspired by Christ's own charity, which takes the form of concern, tenderness, compassion, openness, availability and interest in people's problems" (Para. 89)
- "The call to mission derives, of its nature, from the call to holiness...The universal call to holiness is closely linked to the universal call to mission. Every member of the faithful is called to holiness and to mission...The Church's missionary spirituality is a journey toward holiness." (Para. 90)

=== Conclusion (92) ===
"Like the apostles after Christ’s Ascension, the Church must gather... in order to pray for the Spirit and to gain strength and courage to carry out the missionary mandate." (Para. 92)
