= Pedro Rodríguez (theologian) =

Spanish Roman Catholic priest and theologian (1933–2026)

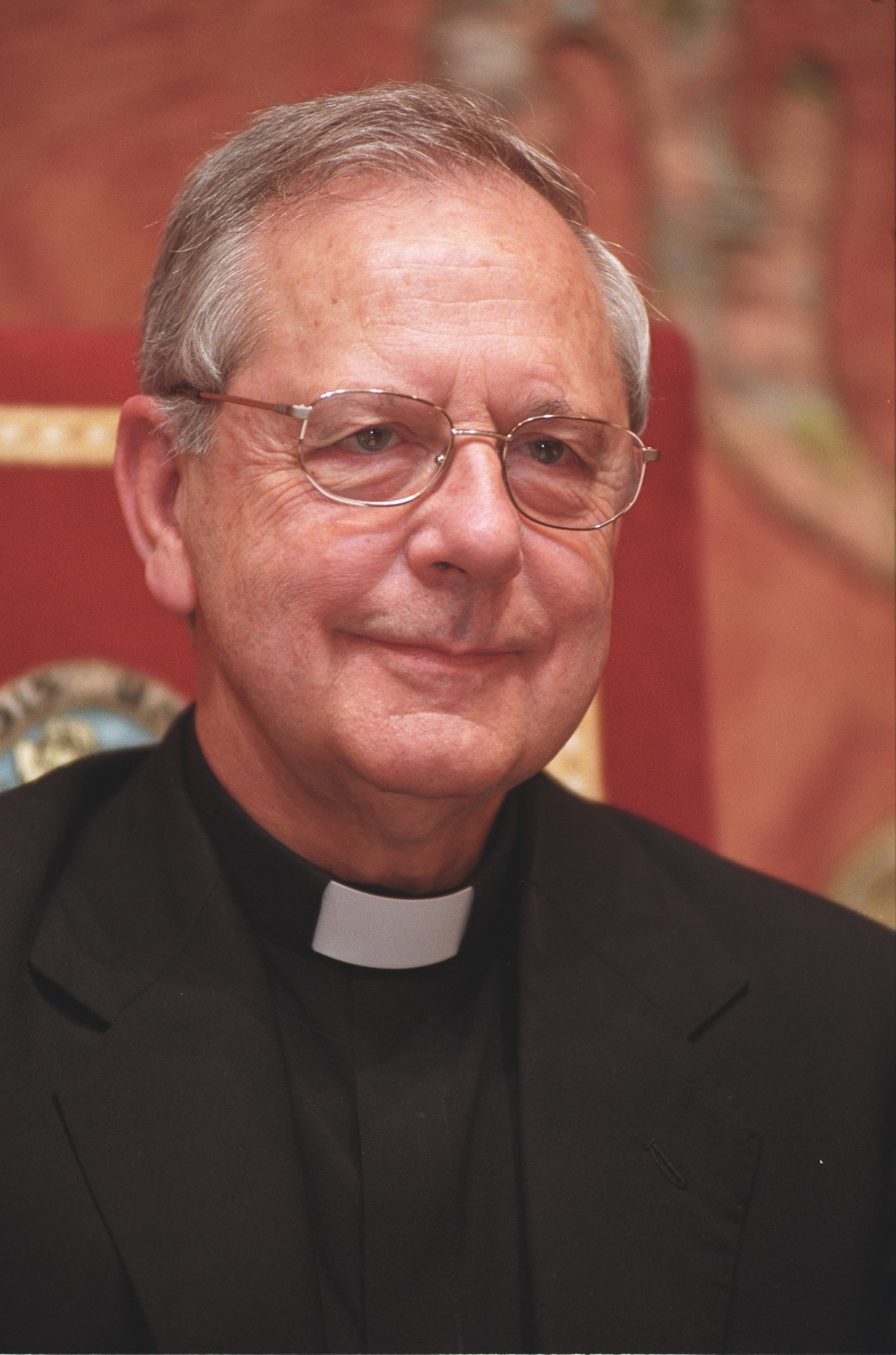
Rodríguez in 2002

Pedro Rodríguez García (Note: In this Spanish name, the first or paternal surname is Rodríguez and the second or maternal family name is García.) (19 July 1933 – 4 September 2026) was a Spanish Roman Catholic priest and theologian who specialized in ecclesiology.

== Biography ==
Pedro Rodríguez García was born in Cartagena, Murcia, on 19 July 1933. He wrote dozens of books and articles on theology. He was a priest of the Opus Dei prelature. He taught at the University of Navarra in Pamplona and was its dean of theology for many years.

Rodríguez died in Pamplona on 4 September 2026, at the age of 93.

== Works ==
Rodríguez's critical edition of the original manuscript of the Catechismus Romanus, the catechism of the Council of Trent, was praised by Cardinal Joseph Ratzinger as being of "great significance" for his own work on the Catechism of the Catholic Church.

William May praised him for his work of analyzing Opus Dei and the founder's teachings, saying that "he has masterfully" discussed the founder's teachings on holiness.

Some of Rodríguez's other works are:

- Critical edition. Roman Catechism.
- The Primacy of the Pope in the Church
- Rodríguez, Pedro, Particular Churches and Personal Prelatures. Dublin, Four Courts Press, 1986.
- Rodríguez, Pedro; Pío G. Aves de Sousa y José Manuel Zumaquero (eds.). Mons. Josemaría Escrivá de Balaguer y el Opus Dei en el 50 Aniversario de su Fundación (2° ed.). Pamplona, Ediciones Universidad de Navarra, 1985.
- Pedro Rodríguez, Fernando Ocáriz, and José Luis Illanes, Opus Dei in the Church: An ecclesiological study of the life and apostolate of Opus Dei, Princeton 1994
- Rodríguez, Vocación, trabajo, contemplación (Pamplona: EUNSA, 1986)
- Rodríguez, Camino: edición critico-histórica, (Instituto Histórico Josemaría Escrivá) – 1250 pages of analysis of Josemaría Escrivá's main work, The Way.
