= Universal call to holiness =

Teaching of the Roman Catholic Church

The universal call to holiness is a teaching of the Catholic Church that all people are called to be holy, and is based on Matthew 5:48: "Be you therefore perfect, as also your heavenly Father is perfect" (Matthew 5:48). In the first book of the Bible, the call to holiness is expressed in the Lord's words to Abraham: "Walk before me, and be blameless" (Genesis 17:1).

== Description ==
Chapter V of the Dogmatic Constitution on the Church, Lumen gentium discusses the Universal Call to Holiness:

...all the faithful of Christ of whatever rank or status, are called to the fullness of the Christian life and to the perfection of charity; ...They must follow in His footsteps and conform themselves to His image seeking the will of the Father in all things. They must devote themselves with all their being to the glory of God and the service of their neighbor.

Pope Benedict XVI spoke on the Universal Call to Holiness during his General Audience of Wednesday, 13 April 2011, saying:

...The saints expressed in various ways the powerful and transforming presence of the Risen One. They let Jesus so totally overwhelm their life that they could say with St Paul "it is no longer I who live, but Christ who lives in me" (Gal 2:20). Following their example, seeking their intercession, entering into communion with them, "brings us closer to Christ, so our companionship with the saints joins us to Christ, from whom as from their fountain and head issue every grace and the life of the People of God itself" (cf. Second Vatican Council, Dogmatic Constitution on the Church, Lumen Gentium, n. 50).

At the end of this series of Catecheses, therefore, I would like to offer some thoughts on what holiness is. What does it mean to be holy? Who is called to be holy? We are often led to think that holiness is a goal reserved for a few elect. St Paul, instead, speaks of God's great plan and says: "even as he (God) chose us in him [Christ] before the foundation of the world, that we should be holy and blameless before him" (Eph 1:4). And he was speaking about all of us. At the centre of the divine plan is Christ in whom God shows his Face, in accord with the favour of his will. The Mystery hidden in the centuries is revealed in its fullness in the Word made flesh. And Paul then says: "in him all the fullness of God was pleased to dwell" (Col 1:19)...

The Second Vatican Council, in the Dogmatic Constitution on the Church, speaks with clarity of the universal call to holiness, saying that no one is excluded: "The forms and tasks of life are many but holiness is one—that sanctity which is cultivated by all who act under God's Spirit and… follow Christ, poor, humble and cross-bearing, that they may deserve to be partakers of his glory" (Lumen Gentium, n. 41)

The universal call to holiness is rooted in baptism, and the Paschal Mystery, which configures a person to Jesus Christ who is truly God and truly man, thus uniting a person with the Second Person of the Blessed Trinity, bringing him in communion with intra-trinitarian life.

Ben Sira taught about lay people that "without these cannot a city be inhabited," and "they will maintain the state of the world, and all their desire is in the work of their craft."

Since 1928, St. Josemaría Escrivá, the founder of Opus Dei, also preached the universal call to holiness especially for lay people living an everyday life and doing ordinary work: "There is something holy, something divine, hidden in the most ordinary situations, and it is up to each of you to discover it."

John Paul II states in his apostolic Letter Novo Millennio Ineunte, his apostolic letter for the new millennium, a "program for all times", that holiness is not only a state but a task, whereby Christians should strive for a full Christian life, imitating Christ, God the Son, who gave his life for God the Father and for his neighbor. This entails a "training in the art of prayer". According to the Pope, all pastoral initiatives have to be set in relation to holiness, as this has to be the topmost priority of the Church. The universal call to holiness is explained as more fundamental than the vocational discernment to particular ways of life such as priesthood, marriage, or virginity.

At the core of the spirituality of a Catholic is this call to perfection.

== See also ==
- Apostolates
- Lay apostolate
- Christian perfection
- Evangelical counsels
- Christian prayer
- Vocational discernment in the Catholic Church
- Familiaris consortio
- Amoris laetitia
