= Spiritual reading =

Roman Catholic spiritual practice

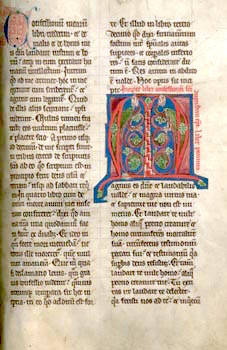
Confessions of St. Augustine

Spiritual reading is a practice of reading books and other texts with the purpose of growing in holiness. In a Christian context, examples include reading writings of Doctors and the Fathers of the Church, theological works written by holy people, the lives of the saints and doctrinal writings of Church authorities. It is different from lectio divina, which focuses on reading and reflecting on the Bible.

The biblical basis is St. Paul's advice to "attend to reading" (1 Timothy 4:13) which meant that Timothy, his disciple, should "apply to the reading of holy books, not in a passing way and for a short time, but regularly and for a considerable time", said St. Alphonsus Liguori, a Doctor of the Catholic Church. St. Bernard of Clairvaux said that "spiritual reading and prayer are the arms by which hell is conquered and paradise won". For the Second Vatican Council, spiritual reading, "under the light of faith", is commended to priests so that "they can more diligently seek signs of God's will and impulses of his grace in the various events of life, and so from day to day become more docile to the mission they have assumed in the Holy Spirit".

== Basis and advantages ==
The biblical basis of this practice is St. Paul's advice to his disciple Timothy whom he appointed bishop. St. Paul told him to "Attend to reading." The word "attend" an allusion to the many other concerns that a bishop has to attend to. By this, according to St. Alphonsus Liguori, Doctor of the Church and moral theologian, the Apostle Paul "wished him to apply to the reading of holy books, not in a passing way and for a short time, but regularly and for a considerable time".

The Fathers of the Church recommended this practice: St. Jerome says that when we pray we speak to God; but when we read, God speaks to us. St. Ambrose of Milan says the same: "We address him when we pray; we hear him when we read."

Spiritual reading is an instruction in prayer and virtue, according to St. Bernard of Clairvaux, and thus he said that "spiritual reading and prayer are the arms by which hell is conquered and paradise won". St. Josemaría Escrivá explained that spiritual reading "builds up a store of fuel. — It looks like a lifeless heap, but I often find that my memory, of its own accord, will draw from it material which fills my prayer with life and inflames my thanksgiving after Communion." (The Way 117)

Spiritual reading provides access to spiritual advice from masters of spirituality, says St. Alphonsus Liguori. Thus, St. Pius X further thoroughly explained:

Everyone knows the great influence that is exerted by the voice of a friend who gives candid advice, assists by his counsel, corrects, encourages and leads one away from error. Blessed is the man who has found a true friend; he that has found him has found a treasure. We should, then, count pious books among our true friends. They solemnly remind us of our duties and of the prescriptions of legitimate discipline; they arouse the heavenly voices that were stifled in our souls; they rid our resolutions of listlessness; they disturb our deceitful complacency; they show the true nature of less worthy affections to which we have sought to close our eyes; they bring to light the many dangers which beset the path of the imprudent. They render all these services with such kindly discretion that they prove themselves to be not only our friends, but the very best of friends. They are always at hand, constantly beside us to assist us in the needs of our souls; their voice is never harsh, their advice is never self-seeking, their words are never timid or deceitful.

"When I read holy books", says St. Gregory the Theologian, concerning the works of St. Basil the Great, "then the spirit and body are illumined and I become the temple of God and the harp of the Holy Spirit, played by divine powers through them I am corrected and through them I receive a kind of divine change and I am made into a different person".

Reading of holy books is also a way to fight temptations: "Endeavor to have always in your hand a pious book," advised St. Jerome to his disciple Salvina, "that with this shield you may defend yourself against bad thoughts."

All the founders of religious institutes have strongly recommended this holy exercise to their religious, said St. Alphonsus.

== Examples of sanctifying effect ==
Throughout the history of Christian spirituality, spiritual reading has been seen to be of great benefit to many people, and according to St. Pius X, "There are many striking examples of the salutary effects of the reading of pious books."

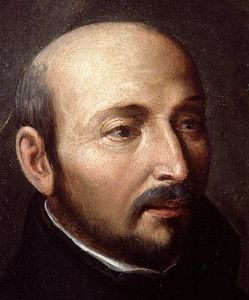
St. Ignatius of Loyola decided to be a man of God after reading the life of Jesus and some saints

Some examples are:

- St. Augustine of Hippo, considered one of the greatest Fathers of the Church, converted to the Catholic Church upon hearing a boy tell him, "Take, read; take, read." He recounted that "I took (the epistles of Paul the Apostle), I opened, I read in silence; it was as though the darkness of all my doubting was driven away by the light of peace which had entered my soul."
- St. Ignatius of Loyola, founder of the Jesuit order in Catholicism, decided to live a saintly life, after reading a volume of the lives of the saints which he accidentally took up while he was in a hospital bed.
- St. Edith Stein, Patron of Europe, converted to Catholicism after reading the autobiography of St. Teresa of Ávila on a holiday in Göttingen in 1921, at the age of 29. One evening Edith picked up an autobiography of St. Teresa of Ávila and read this book all night. "When I had finished the book, I said to myself: This is the truth." She went out the next day to buy a missal and a copy of the Catholic catechism.
- Thomas Merton, a known spiritual writer, read a book by Étienne Gilson, on "The Elements of Christian Philosophy" and decided to study Catholicism. He later converted and became a Trappist monk.

== Practice ==
St. Alphonsus recommends some principles and attitudes for spiritual reading.

- Ask God for help beforehand, because through reading it is God who speaks to us. Thus he recommended the prayer of Samuel: Speak, Lord, for your servant is listening. Speak, O my Lord, for I wish to obey you in all that you will make known to me to be your will.
- The exclusive purpose of the reading is to advance in divine love, and not to acquire learning and indulge in curiosity. To do spiritual reading with false intentions is "a study unprofitable to the soul," and "lost time."
- Read slowly and with attention. "'Nourish your soul,' says St. Augustine, 'with divine lectures.'" To be nourished, he said, one must chew and well and ponder well, and apply the teachings to oneself. "And when what you have read has made a lively impression on you, St. Ephrem counsels you to read it a second time...Besides, when you receive any special light in reading, or any instruction that penetrates the heart, it will be very useful to stop, and to raise the mind to God by making a good resolution, or a good act, or a fervent prayer. St. Bernard says, that it is useful then to interrupt the reading, and to offer a prayer, and to continue to pray as long as the lively impression lasts."
- Select some sentiment of devotion, at the end of reading. "Carry it with you as you would carry a flower from a garden of pleasure."
