= List of members of Opus Dei =

This is a list of prominent Opus Dei members. It is intended to include people whose membership in Opus Dei is documented in published sources, and therefore a matter of public record.

The names of Opus Dei directors and priests are available in official Catholic journals and Opus Dei's official bulletin, Romana.

Opus Dei maintains lists of cooperators, who are not considered by Opus Dei to be members, and who do not even have to be Roman Catholics, but who agree to assist with the work of Opus Dei in any of various ways. Such cooperators are not included in this list.

This article should by no means be considered an exhaustive list of past and present members and sympathisers of Opus Dei involved in political, religious, cultural, academic or literary life.

== Opus Dei policy on publicizing membership ==
Opus Dei treats membership status of its lay members in a confidential manner, having a stated policy of neither confirming nor denying the membership of Opus Dei until the member in question has publicly acknowledged his or her membership.

Opus Dei supporter William O'Connor wrote that a person's spiritual life is a private matter, and that the practice of not divulging membership lists is common to many organizations such as trade unions, hospitals, schools and clubs. He stated that it is part of the secular nature of vocation to Opus Dei that its members do not represent the religious organization which provide them with spiritual instruction, in the same way that professionals do not externally represent their alma maters. According to several journalists who wrote independently on Opus Dei accusations of secrecy come from a clericalist mentality which equates Opus Dei members with monks and priests, the traditional symbols of holiness who are externally identifiable as such.

Detractors argue that, given Opus Dei's strong defence of traditional Catholic positions in social and moral matters, especially in regard to anti-abortion and marriage, membership of the organisation is indeed relevant to exercising functions in the public domain. In addition, Opus Dei states that it is a non-political organisation and does not direct or try to influence its members in any way in the fulfillment of their professional duties, whether in the public or private sphere, except where such activities impinge on their duties as Catholics.

For the most part, Opus Dei members belong to the low and middle class in terms of income, social status and education. Among its members are barbers, bricklayers, mechanics, and fruit sellers. Most supernumeraries are living ordinary middle-class lives.

== Government and Civil Service ==
- José María Albareda (1902–1966), Secretary General and head of the Spanish National Research Council (Consejo Superior de Investigaciones Científicas). He was close friend of Escrivá and one of the first numerary members of Opus Dei. He was also a close friend of José Ibáñez Martín, Minister of Education for Franco from 1939 to 1951, who is wrongly credited with sponsoring the great expansion of Opus Dei into Spanish third-level education during that period.
- Mario Fernández Baeza (born 1947), Interior Minister of Chile. Belongs to the left-leaning Christian Democratic Party.
- Paola Binetti (born 1943), Senator in Italy. A numerary member. Binetti belonged to the christian-social party La Margherita (“The Daisy”), the Democratic Party and now the Union of the Centre.
- Juan José Espinosa San Martín (1918–1982), Minister for Finance (1965–1969, Spain under Franco).
- Jesus Estanislao (born 1939), Secretary of Economic Planning and subsequently Finance Secretary of the Philippines under Corazon Aquino (1989–1992), who toppled the dictatorial government of Ferdinand Marcos. A numerary member of Opus Dei, who started Opus Dei in the Philippines.
- Jorge Fernández Díaz (born 1950), Spanish politician of the Partido Popular, former minister of the Interior.
- Antonio Fontán (1923–2010), President of the Senate of Spain in 1977–1979. A journalist who advocated free elections and trade unions and was persecuted by Franco. He helped draft Spain's new democratic constitution after Franco.
- Faustino García-Moncó Fernández (1916–1996), Minister for Trade (1965–1969, Spain under Franco).
- Rory O'Hanlon (1923–2002), Professor of Criminal and Constitutional Law at University College Dublin and High Court Judge in Ireland (1981–1995). He was dismissed by the Irish Government from Presidency of the Law Reform Commission in 1992, after commenting that if membership of the EU forced the introduction of abortion to Ireland, the country should withdraw from the Union. He later sued the Government and won substantial damages. He was a supernumerary member of Opus Dei.
- Robert Hanssen (1944–2023), FBI agent who was convicted of spying for the Soviet Union and Russia. His treason has been described as "possibly the worst intelligence disaster in US history." A supernumerary, he reportedly left Opus Dei after his arrest.
- Fernando Herrero Tejedor (1920–1975), Secretary General of the Movimiento (Franco's political party) (1975).

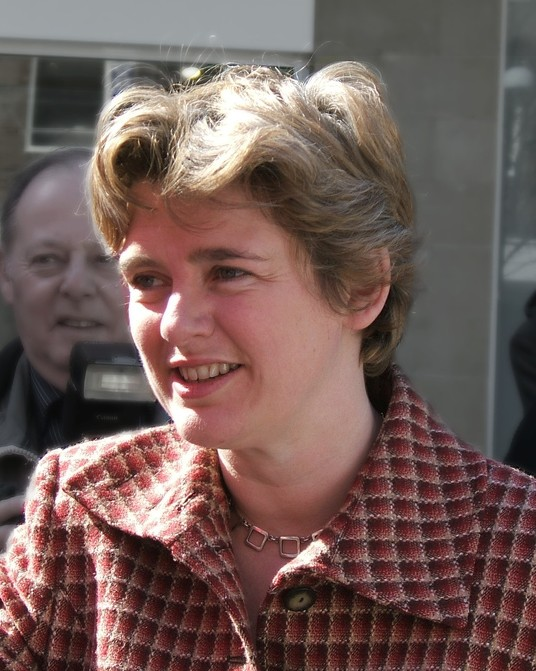
Rt. Hon. Ruth Kelly MP (UK)

- Ruth Kelly (born 1968), former British Transport Secretary, Labour Party (traditionally center left) in the United Kingdom. John L. Allen Jr. states that she is a supernumerary member in his book Opus Dei.
- Guillermo Lasso (born 1955), President of Ecuador and supernumerary of Opus Dei.
- Joaquín Lavín (born 1953), politician in Chile, twice defeated in his bid for the presidency of Chile. He is a member of the Independent Democratic Union (UDI) party and former mayor of Santiago and Las Condes municipalities of capital Santiago. He was also Minister of Education and Social Development (2010–2013)
- Gregorio López Bravo (1923–1985), Minister for Industry (1963–1969, Spain under Franco), Minister of Foreign Affairs (1969–1973). A supernumerary.
- Mario Maiolo (born 1963), Vice-president of the province of Cosenza. He belonged to the Italian Peoples' Party, La Margherita and later the Democratic Party. He is a supernumerary.
- Alberto Michelini (born 1941), Italian film director, journalist and politician, member of the Italian Chamber of Deputies and Member of the European Parliament for Christian Democracy and subsequently center-right Forza Italia party. A supernumerary member.
- Vicente Mortes Alfonso (1921–1991), Minister for Housing (1969–1973, Spain under Franco). A supernumerary
- Patrick Ngugi Njoroge (born 1961), PhD, Kenyan economist, banker and the governor of the Central Bank of Kenya.
- Jorge Rossi Chavarría (1922–2006), Vice-President of Costa Rica in 1971–1974. He co-founded the National Liberation Party (PLN), a social democrat party. He was a supernumerary of Opus Dei.
- Adolfo Suárez (1932–2014), President of Government in the democracy in Spain from 1978 to 1982, was a supernumerary member of Opus Dei.
- Federico Trillo-Figueroa y Martínez-Conde (born 1952), Spanish politician of the Partido Popular, ex-chairman of the Spanish Chamber of Representatives, former minister of Defence ambassador for Spain in the United Kingdom.
- Alberto Ullastres Calvo (1914–2001), Spanish Minister of Trade (1957–1965). He is one of the members of Opus Dei who were appointed by Franco as ministers (Spain under Franco). He pushed forward the so-called Plan of Stabilization which brought about Spain's transition from economic autarchy to liberalization and internationalization of the national economy.
- Przemysław Wipler (born 1978), Polish MP, a supernumerary as of 2023.

== Writing and journalism ==
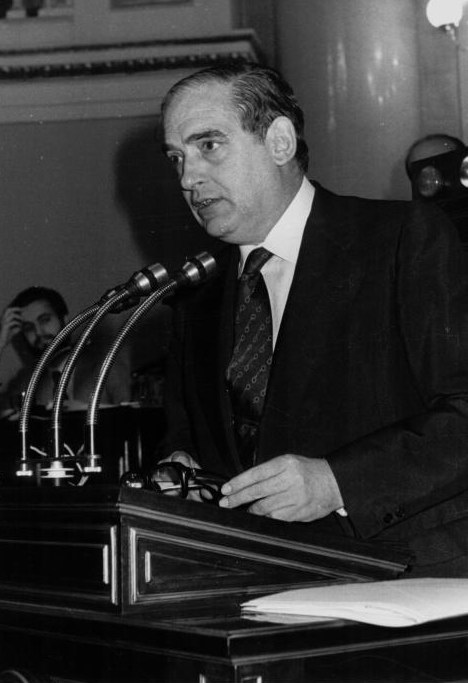
Antonio Fontán, Spanish journalist who fought for press freedom. He later became the first Senate President of Spain's democracy.

- Joaquín Navarro-Valls (1936–2017), physician and journalist who later served as the Director of the Vatican Press Office, taking the post in 1984. A numerary member.
- Robert Duncan, journalist. An ombudsman for foreign press in Spain; vice-president of OPCI Ibero-American press association; vice-president of APSCE, association for energy and telecommunications; past executive board member for Spain's oldest and largest foreign press body, the Club Internaciónal de Prensa; editor for Spero News and EnerPub.
- Rafael Calvo Serer (1916–1988), editor and founder of Diario Madrid who was hounded into exile for his criticism of Franco, who closed the publication. Although Messori states that Calvo, by working underground, helped to bring democracy to Spain, According to some, he did not oppose Francoism, but Franco himself about Franco's succession (see Preston 623-3, 663 and 671).
- Antonio Fontán (1923–2010), journalist who advocated free elections and trade unions in Spain under Franco. Later served as President of the Senate and helped draft Spain's new democratic constitution.
- Francisco Fernández Carvajal (born 1938), wrote In Conversation with God, which has sold over two million copies in several languages, including Spanish, English, French, Italian, Portuguese, German, Dutch, Romanian, Slovak and Polish. It consists of over 450 meditations, one or more for every day of the year, as well as three meditations for each Sunday, corresponding to the three-year cycle in the Catholic lectionary.
- Pilar Urbano (born 1940), Spanish journalist whose interviewing technique has become a model for other journalists. Numerary.
- Cesare Cavalleri (1936–2022), Italian literary critic and publisher. He received the Premio internazionale Medaglia d'oro per la Cultura cattolica (International Golden Medal Award for Catholic Culture).
- Michael Adams (died 2009), Irish publisher, was a numerary member and the Managing Director of Four Courts Press, Ireland's largest academic publishing house. Adams was the author of a book Censorship: The Irish Experience, which was critical of the operation of the former Irish system of literary censorship.
- Paul Dumol, Filipino playwright, famous for Paglilitis ni Mang Serapio. He is also the Chairman of the Philippine Center for Civic Education and Democracy.
- Alexandre Havard (born 1962), French writer on management and self-development.

== Academia ==
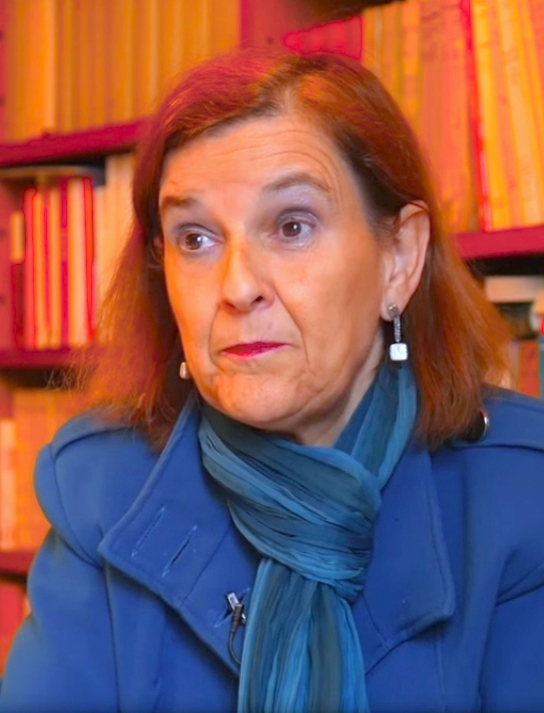
María Elósegui was appointed in January 2018 a judge at the European Court of Human Rights.

- Ignacio Rodriguez-Iturbe (1942–2022), Venezuelan-American scientist and is James S. McDonnell Distinguished University Professor at Princeton University. He received the 2002 Stockholm Water Prize for his role in developing the science of hydrology. He believes in global warming and evolutionary theory and rejects intelligent design.
- Mariano Artigas (1938–2006), received Templeton Foundation Award in 1995 for his work on science and religion. He wrote The Mind of the Universe: Understanding Science and Religion and fifteen other books on science and religion.
- John F. Coverdale (born 1940), law professor at Seton Hall University.
- Scott Hahn (born 1957), American theologian, former Presbyterian pastor and convert to Catholicism. He is best known for his conversion story Rome Sweet Home and theology books like The Lamb's Supper: The Mass as Heaven on Earth or First Comes Love: Finding Your Family in the Church and the Trinity. He recounts his membership in Opus Dei in his book Ordinary Work, Extraordinary Grace: My Spiritual Journey in Opus Dei. A supernumerary.
- Bernardo Villegas (born 1939), Founded the Center for Research and Communication, which became the University of Asia and the Pacific.
- José Orlandis (1918–2010), historian who is known for his work ''Short History of the Catholic Church. He recounts his early years in Opus Dei in his book Años de Juventud en el Opus Dei
- Ives Gandra Martins Filho (born 1959), Brazilian law scholar and professor in Brazilian universities, writer on law and history. Prof. Gandra published at least 40 books. In order to maintain his independence from government, he did not accept payment for his services to the government. He was even persecuted by the military government.
- Jaime Nubiola (born 1953), Spanish philosopher teaching at the Universidad de Navarra in Spain, specializing in philosophy of language, American philosophy, Charles Sanders Peirce and pragmatism. A numerary.
- Martin Rhonheimer (born 1950), Swiss philosopher teaching at the Pontifical University of the Holy Cross in Rome, specializing in ethics, the theory of liberalism and in the relationship between politics and religion. An Opus Dei priest.
- Fernando Ocariz (born 1944), theologian and consultor of the Congregation for the Doctrine of the Faith. He was one of the primary authors of the document Dominus Iesus. He is presently the Prelate of Opus Dei.
- Joseph de Torre (1932–2018), social and political philosopher. He has written a number of works on social ethics and Catholic social teaching.
- Enrique Colom (born 1941), was a contributing editor of the Compendium of the Social Doctrine of the Church made by the Pontifical Council for Justice and Peace. He is a member of the Scientific Committee of the Card. Van Thuan International Observatory which promotes Catholic social teaching internationally.
- Antonio Millán-Puelles (February 11, 1921 – March 22, 2005), philosopher influenced by Aristotle and phenomenology. He focused on freedom, subjectivity and conscience, the relationship between logic and metaphysics, and social issues.
- Leonardo Polo (1926–2013), long-time professor of philosophy at University of Navarra who developed a theory of the "mental limit".
- María Elósegui (born 1957) is a Spanish jurist, philosopher and Professor of Philosophy of Law at the Faculty of Law at the University of Zaragoza. She was appointed in January 2018 a judge at the European Court of Human Rights.

== Social work and medicine ==
- Toni Zweifel (1938–1989), Swiss engineer who patented several inventions. He founded and served as director of the Limmat Foundation, a foundation that supports social projects all over the world with a majority of women as project beneficiaries. His process of beatification has been opened. A numerary.
- Margaret Ogola (1958–2011), medical director of the Cottolengo Hospice in Nairobi for HIV-positive orphans and Kenyan author. A supernumerary with four children, she heads the Commission for Health and Family Life for the Kenyan bishops' conference. Her novel The River and the Source, which follows four generations of Kenyan women in a rapidly changing country and society, won the Africa Region Commonwealth Award for Literature. Interested in women's empowerment, she is also Vice-President of Family Life Counselling (Kenya).
- John Henry (1939–2007), "one of the world's leading authorities on drugs and poisons" and "Britain's best known toxicologist [who] made frequent appearances on television and radio."
- Umberto Farri (died 2006), founder and President of Istituto per la Cooperazione Universitaria (Institute for University Co-operation) or ICU. It is a non-governmental organization which has completed over 200 development co-operation projects in 32 countries.
- Felipe González de Canales, co-founder of a system of agriculture schools and rural development centers called Escuelas Familiares Agrarias (Agrarian Family Schools) which has 30 schools in Spain and has influenced 68 other agricultural schools in other parts of the world. He is also the founder of two trade unions. He is an associate member of Opus Dei.
- César Ortiz-Echagüe, Spanish architect and priest who co-designed the award-winning SEAT factory complex and dining hall in Barcelona. He served for over a decade as the Regional Vicar of Opus Dei in Germany.

== Business ==
- Isidre Fainé (born 1942), President of CaixaBank, as of 2012 Spain's largest bank in assets.
- Luis Valls (1926–2006), From 1972 to 2004, he was President of Banco Popular, the third biggest bank in Spain. A numerary.
- Eduardo Guilisasti, Chief Executive Officer of Concha y Toro Winery. He told Bloomberg.com that he is a supernumerary member.
- Pepe Serret Borda (1941–1993), Spanish economist who was a director of several food companies and also was involved in promoting schools. Was a supernumerary member of Opus Dei.
- Jacques de Chateauvieux (born 1951), President of Bourbon, a company engaged in international marine services.
- Neil Dean was Chief Financial Officer of Allied Irish Banks, the largest Bank in Ireland, until 1997 and is a supernumerary member.
- José María Ruiz-Mateos (1931–2015), a prominent Spanish businessman involved in the infamous RUMASA scandal, was a supernumerary member of Opus Dei from 1963 until his expulsion in 1986.
- Maurice O'Grady, was Chief Executive of the Irish Management Institute, and is a supernumerary.

== Sports, fashion, and entertainment ==
- Isaac Viciosa (born 1969), Spanish middle-distance runner who is the European record holder at 3000 m. He said in an interview that he is a supernumerary of Opus Dei.
- Antonio Bienvenida (1922–1975), famous Spanish bullfighter. According to the Encyclopædia Britannica, "The great Antonio Bienvenida...was killed by a small heifer on his ranch in 1975." A supernumerary.
- Juan Antonio Samaranch (1920–2010), the seventh President of the International Olympic Committee (IOC) from 1980 to 2001.

== Clergy ==
- Saint Josemaría Escrivá (1902–1975), founder of Opus Dei
- Blessed Álvaro del Portillo y Díez de Sollano (1914–1994), Prelate of Opus Dei (1975–1994) and Titular Bishop of Vita
- Javier Echevarría Rodríguez (1932–2016), Prelate of Opus Dei and Titular Bishop of Cilibia (1994–2016)
- Juan Luis Cipriani Thorne (born 1943), Cardinal Archbishop of Lima, former Archbishop of Ayacucho and Huamanga, Peru. He is an outspoken critic of liberation theology.
- Julián Herranz Casado (born 1930), former Cardinal President of the Pontifical Council for Legislative Texts
- José Horacio Gómez (born 1951), current Archbishop of Los Angeles since 2011. Fortune Magazine listed him as one of the top 50 most influential Latinos in the U.S.
- Francisco Javier López Díaz (born 1949), theologian at the Pontifical University of the Holy Cross in Rome.

For other members of the clergy, please see Opus Dei: Priestly Society of the Holy Cross.
