= Echagüe =

Echagüe is a Spanish surname. The name has its origins in Basque, and derives from the word "etxague", which means "the house" This is likely to reflect the importance of residence in its culture. Notable people with the surname include:

- César Ortiz-Echagüe (1927–2026), Spanish architect, academic and Roman Catholic prelate (Opus Dei)
- Eligio Echagüe (1938–2009), Paraguayan footballer
- Héctor Echagüe (born 1988), Argentine footballer
- Jorge Echagüe, known as Coco Echagüe (born 1971), Uruguayan actor, singer and television presenter
- José Ortiz-Echagüe (1886–1980), Spanish entrepreneur, engineer, pilot and photographer
- Ofelia Echagüe Vera (1904–1987), Paraguayan artist and educator
- Pascual Echagüe (1797–1867), Argentine soldier and politician
- Rafaél de Echagüe y Bermingham (1815–1915), Spanish officer and governor of the Philippines (1862–1865)

== See also ==
- Antonio Ortiz Echagüe (1883–1942), Spanish painter
- María Mestayer de Echagüe (1877–1949), Spanish gastronome, food writer and businesswoman
- Moisés Ríos Echagüe (1902–1961), Chilean politician
- Atlético Echagüe, an Argentine professional basketball team
