= José Antônio Rezende de Almeida Prado =

Brazilian composer and pianist (1943–2010)

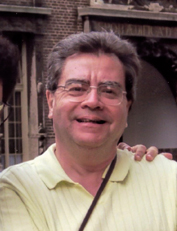
- Born: February 8, 1943; Santos, São Paulo, Brazil
- Died: November 21, 2010 (aged 67); São Paulo, Brazil
- Occupations: Composer, Pianist, Music Professor

José Antônio Rezende de Almeida Prado or Almeida Prado (February 8, 1943 – November 21, 2010) was an important Brazilian composer of classical music and a pianist. On Almeida Prado's death, his personal friend, conductor João Carlos Martins stated that Prado had possibly been the most important Brazilian composer ever.

Prado wrote over 400 compositions and won various prizes for his work.

He was born in Santos, São Paulo in 1943. He died in São Paulo in 2010, having lived there for the latter part of his life.

== Training ==
In Brazil, Almeida Prado studied with Dinorá de Carvalho (piano), Osvaldo Lacerda (harmony) and Camargo Guarnieri (composition).

Upon winning first prize for his cantata Pequenos Funerais Cantantes, based on a text by Hilda Hilst, at the I Festival de Música da Guanabara in 1969, he continued his studies in Europe. He studied with Olivier Messiaen and Nadia Boulanger in Paris from 1970 to 1973, besides brief studies with György Ligeti and Lukas Foss in Darmstadt.

== Professional activities ==
Returning to Brazil in 1974, Almeida Prado first taught at the Conservatório Municipal de Cubatão, and then, hired by Zeferino Vaz, he became a professor at the UNICAMP Institute of the Arts, retiring in 2000. After his retirement he settled in São Paulo, where he occasionally taught music courses and presented a radio program at Cultura FM.

In January 2007, his cantata Hiléia, Um Mural da Amazônia, based on the poem of the same name by Ives Gandra Martins, was performed at Carnegie Hall by the Orquestra Bachiana Filarmônica de São Paulo conducted by João Carlos Martins.

== Selected works ==
Orchestral

- Sinfonia no. 1 (1970)
- Abertura Cidade de Campinas (1976)
- Sinfonia Unicamp (1976)
- Abertura Cidade de São Paulo (1981)
- Sinfonia dos Orixás (1985)
- Arcos Sonoros da Catedral de Bruckner (1996)
- Symphonic Variations (2005)

Concertante

- Variações sobre um tema do Rio Grande do Norte (1963) for piano and orchestra
- Ceremonial (1971) for bassoon and orchestra
- Exoflora (1974) for piano and orchestra
- Aurora (1975) for piano and orchestra
- Concerto for violin and string orchestra (1976)
- Crônica de um dia de verão (1979), for clarinet and string orchestra
- Concerto for flute and string orchestra (1981)
- Piano Concerto no. 1 (1983)
- Variações concertantes para marimba, vibrafone e cordas (1984)
- Concerto Fribourgeois for piano e string orchestra (1985)
- Fantasia (1997) for violin and orchestra
- Psalm 148 (1997) for piano and concert band
- Cartas Celestes VII (1998) for 2 pianos and concert band
- Cartas Celestes VIII (1999) for violin and orchestra
- Concerto for oboe and string orchestra (2001)

Chamber music

- Cantus Mobiles (1966) for violin and piano
- Portrait de Lili Boulanger (1972) for flute, piano and string quartet
- Livro Sonoro (1973) for string quartet
- Ex Itinere (1974) for piano and string trio
- Continuous movement (1976) for string quartet
- Macaíra: a pescaria fantástica (1977), for harpsichord and 2 pianos (or 4-hand piano)
- Paná-Paná I (1977) for flute, oboe and piano
- String Quartet no. 1 (1978)
- Paná-Paná II (1981) for clarinet, cello and piano
- Violin Sonata no. 1 (1980)
- Viola Sonata (1983)
- Trio marítimo (1983) for violin, cello e piano
- Violin Sonata no. 2 (1984)
- Xangô (1984–85) for violin and cello
- Réquiem para a paz (1985) for viola and piano
- Sonata for flute and piano (1986)
- Violin Sonata no. 3 (1991)
- Sonata Tropical (1996) for 2 guitars
- 4 Corais (1998) for double bass and piano
- Sonata for trombone and piano (1998)
- Cartas Celestes XI (2000) for vibraphone, marimba and piano
- Sonata for cello and piano (2003)
- Violin Sonata no. 4 (2007)

Piano

- 14 Estudos (1962-2003)
- 55 Momentos (1965–83)
- 11 Piano Sonatas (1965-2001)
- Ilhas (1973)
- Cartas celestes I (1974)
- Rios (1976)
- Itinerário idílico e amoroso ou Livro de Helenice (1976)
- Cartas celestes II-VI (1981–82)
- Savanas (1983)
- 16 Poesilúdios (1983-1985)
- 24 Corais (1984-1999)
- 12 Sonetos (1984-1999)
- 14 Noturnos (1985-1991)
- Halley (1986)
- Rosário de Medjugorje (1987-2002)
- 9 Louvores Sonoros (1988)
- Três Croquis de Israel (1989)
- 25 Prelúdios (1989-1992)
- Quinze Flashes de Jerusalém (1990)
- 5 Líricas (1994-2007)
- Cartas celestes IX-XIV (1999-2001)
- Cartas celestes XV-XVIII (2009-2010)

Choral

- Ritual para a Sexta-feira Santa para coro e orquestra (1966)
- Paixão de Nosso Senhor Jesus Cristo segundo São Marcos (1967)
- Pequenos funerais cantantes para coro, solistas, orquestra (1969)
- Carta de Patmo para coro, solista e orquestra (1971)
- Thèrèse ou l’Amour de Dieu para coro e orquestra (1986)
- Cantata Bárbara Heliodora para solistas, coro misto e orquestra de câmara (1987)
- Cantata Adonay Roi Loeçar para solistas, coro e orquestra de câmara (1989)

== Publications ==
- Prado, José Antônio R. De Almeida, Cartas Celestes: uma uranografia sonora geradora de novos processos composicionais. Campinas: Universidade Estadual de Campinas, Instituto de Artes, Departamento de Música: 1986. Tese (Doutorado).
