= Francisco Javier López Díaz =

Francisco Javier López Díaz may refer to:

- Francisco Javier López Díaz (theologian) (born 1949), theologian and priest of Opus Dei.
- Francisco Javier López Díaz (footballer) (born 1988), Spanish footballer.
