= Ives Gandra Martins =

Brazilian lawyer

Ives Gandra da Silva Martins GOIH • ComMM (São Paulo, Brazil, February 12, 1935) is a Brazilian jurist, lawyer, professor and writer, professor emeritus of the Mackenzie University Law School and member of the Brazilian Academy of Philosophy.

== Family ==
He is the father of the Minister of the Superior Labor Court (TST, in Portuguese) Ives Gandra Martins Filho and the lawyer Angela Vidal Gandra Martins, as well as brother of pianist and conductor João Carlos Martins and pianist and teacher José Eduardo Martins.

== Conservatism ==
A conservative-oriented jurist, he is a member of the Opus Dei prelature and a proeminent figure of Conservatism in Brazil.
