= Ives Gandra Martins Filho =

Brazilian judge

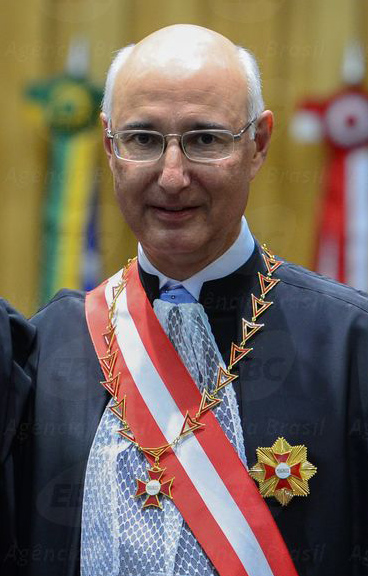
In 2016

Ives Gandra da Silva Martins Filho (born May 9, 1959) is a Brazilian jurist and professor. He has served as Minister of the Superior Labor Court since 1999 and presided the Court form 2016 to 2018. His writings concern primarily labor law and the philosophy of law.

He was a member of the Superior Council of Labor Justice from 2004 to 2005 and the National Council of Justice between 2009 and 2011

== Biography ==
Born in São Paulo, he is the son of jurist Ives Gandra Martins, brother of lawyer Angela Gandra, and nephew of classical pianist João Carlos Martins. A graduate of the Faculty of Law of the University of São Paulo, he completed a Master's degree at the University of Brasília under Moreira Alves, presenting a thesis entitled A Legitimidade do Direito Positivo – Direito Natural, Democracia e Jurisprudência. In 2014, he earned a doctorate from the Federal University of Rio Grande do Sul with the thesis O controle disciplinar da magistratura e o perfil ético do magistrado, supervised by José Alcebíades de Oliveira Júnior.

In the 1980s, he practiced as a lawyer before becoming a legal analyst at the Superior Labor Court, where he served as an aide to Carlos Coqueijo Costa. In 1988, he became a labor prosecutor. From 1997 to 1999, he worked as an aide to Gilmar Mendes at the Chief of Staff of the Presidency. In 1999, he was appointed by Fernando Henrique Cardoso as Minister of the Superior Labor Court.

He taught labor law and labor procedure at the University of Brasília from 1984 to 1988 and compared labor law at the postgraduate program of the Centro Universitário de Brasília in 1990. In 2006, he received the Order of Military Merit.

In 2017, during the presidency of Michel Temer, he was considered as a candidate for a seat at the Supreme Federal Court, but the President ultimately chose Alexandre de Moraes. In 2021, under Jair Bolsonaro, he was identified as one of the prioritized candidates for the seat left by Marco Aurélio Mello, but André Mendonça was appointed for the position instead.

== Positions ==
A member of the Catholic prelature Opus Dei, he is widely regarded as a conservative jurist. Influenced by neothomism, he postulates natural law as the basis of legal order and family. He defends the flexibilization of labor laws, denoucing what he considers a form of ''paternalism'' in Brazilian Labor Justice, and advocates a core of universal labor laws, with negotiated rules predominating in specific sectors of the workforce.

In March 2017, as President of the Superior Labor Court, he accepted a request to impede the publication of the so-called ''dirty list'', which contained the names of employers who had subjected their workers to conditions analogous to slavery. In April of the same year, he expressed support for the end of mandatory union tax. Martins Filho criticized high indemnifications for workplace accidents, explaining that excessive costs could encourage workers to ''mutilate themselves''. He defended the regulation of outsorced labor (trabalho terceirizado) and advocated a greater importance should be placed on collective negotiation of labor conditions.

He condemned same-sex marriage, arguing that its legalization undermined the substance of the concept of ''marriage'', and stated that women should obey their husbands within marriage.

== Personal life ==
Martins Filho is an admirer of J. R. R. Tolkien and wrote the book O Mundo do Senhor dos Anéis, a guide into the fictional world of The Lord of the Rings. He translated the book Orthodoxy by G. K. Chesterton to Portuguese and authored a preface to an edition published by the house Ecclesiae.
