= Joseph de Torre =

Spanish philosopher (1932–2018)

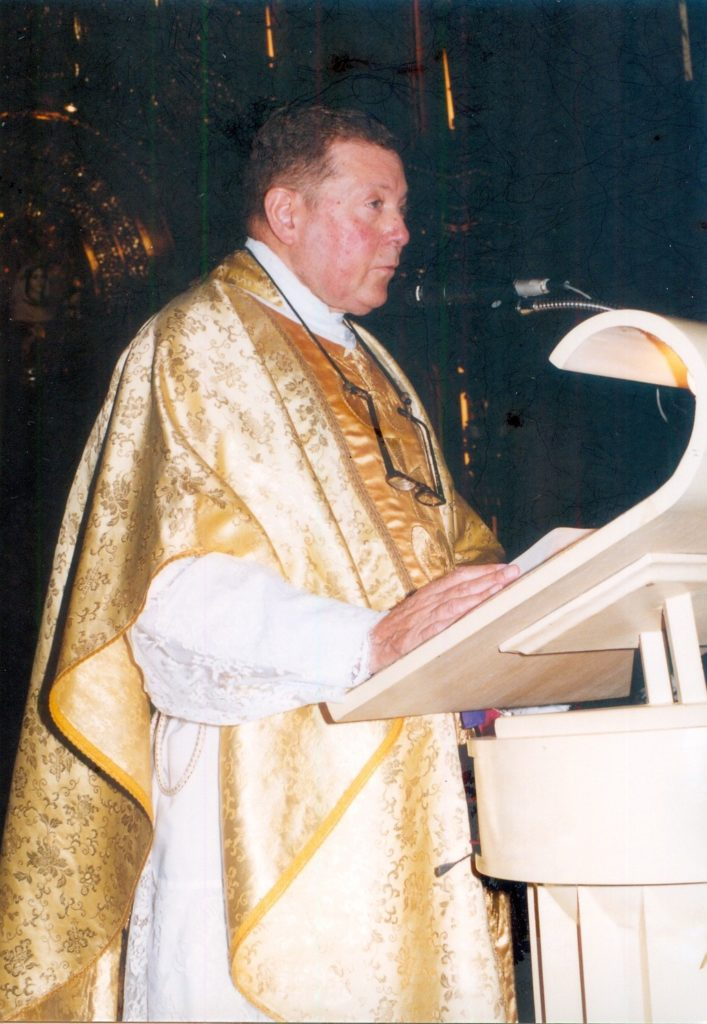
Fr. Joseph de Torre at Mass, 24 August 2016.

Joseph de Torre (May 25, 1932—May 31, 2018) was a Spanish social and political philosopher and a Roman Catholic priest. He is the author of books on social ethics, Catholic social teaching, modern philosophy and spirituality. He was a member of the Carnegie Council for Ethics in International Affairs, and the Acton Institute for the Study of Religion and Liberty. He earned a Bachelor of Arts from the University of Barcelona and obtained his masters and doctorate in Philosophy from the Angelicum (Rome), where he studied under Fr. Reginald Garrigou-Lagrange, OP. Residing in the Philippines since 1968, De Torre was the author of twenty books and hundreds of essays, and his Christian Philosophy has been widely used as a reference text in universities locally and abroad. He was fluent in Latin, Greek, Spanish and English. He died on May 31, 2018 after suffering from debilitating musculo-skeletal problems, macular degeneration, and pneumonia.

== Early life ==
José María Callejas de Torre was born on 25 May 1932 in Madrid, Spain. His father, José María Torre Aguirre-Sarasúa, came from a well-to-do family in Bilbao, and his mother, Pilar Callejas Ocio, was born in Logroño. His father worked as a professional footballer and later as a theatre actor, through which he met Pilar. She had been orphaned in early childhood and had little formal education. She was raised by her widowed father until, as a young adolescent, she was adopted by a touring Catalan theatre company, which eventually brought her into contact with de Torre’s father. His parents married canonically in Madrid in 1923 under the influence of de Torre’s grandmother, Elvira Aguirre-Sarasúa.

During his childhood the Spanish Civil War broke out (1936–1939); Madrid and Barcelona were under Republican control, with the latter being a stronghold for anarchists. Although his father had been active in leftist anti-monarchist and anti-clerical movements (including the anarchist group FAI and the labor union CNT), he refused to take part in the killings of clergy and religious during the War. Following the War, his family moved to Barcelona. His father worked in film dubbing, and young José María gained early exposure to English through this.

Jose María completed his elementary education by 1944, then attended Milá Instituto for secondary school. From 1947 he simultaneously attended the Barcelona Conservatory of Music, alongside his high school studies. In late 1947 his father, then aged 52, died of tuberculosis and other illnesses. After his father’s death, de Torre worked with his mother in theatre and dubbing to help with family finances.

While still in school, he distinguished himself academically, becoming valedictorian at Milá Instituto in 1948–49. His intellectual interests increasingly shifted towards philosophy and religion under the influence of two philosophy professors. In 1950, during a Holy Year, he made a retreat with a Jesuit priest, Fr. Arcusa, which marked a profound conversion experience. Although he initially considered joining the Jesuits, he became drawn to Opus Dei. In April 1951, after spiritual reflection, he formally requested admission as a numerary member of Opus Dei. He passed his Bachelor’s degree final exams in philosophy at the University of Barcelona in June of that year.

He proceeded to the Pontifical University of Saint Thomas Aquinas, the Angelicum in Rome, where he obtained both a Master of Arts degree and a Doctorate in Philosophy. The then medium of instruction at the Angelicum was Latin, hence De Torre's fluency in the language. He was ordained in 1955 as a priest of Opus Dei, and spent the next thirteen years in Ireland and England in continuous pastoral and educational work.

== Academic work ==
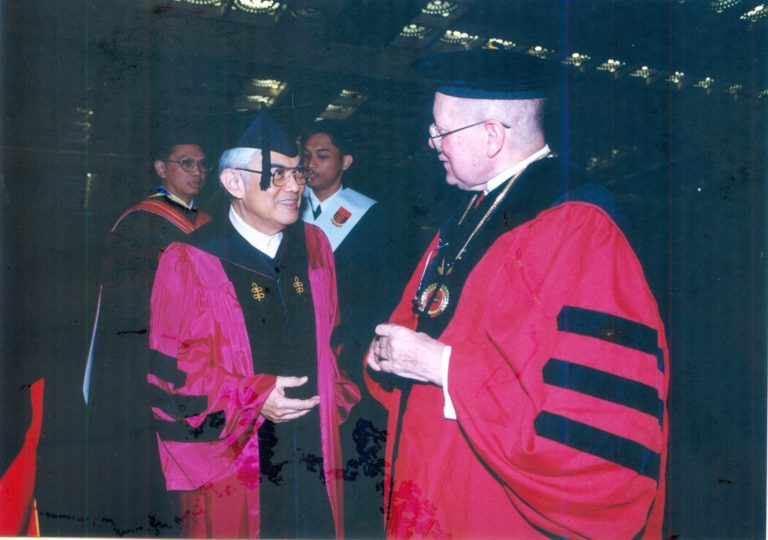
Fr. Joseph de Torre at graduation rites for masters degrees at the Meralco Theater, University of Asia and the Pacific, 10 June 2000.

In 1968 he went to the Philippines. Since 1970 he taught social ethics, social economics and modern philosophy at the Center for Research and Communication (CRC), as well as imparting courses on “theology for lay people.” He chaired the department of Philosophy at the CRC College of Arts and Sciences from 1989 to 1994, and thereafter became University Professor of Social and Political Philosophy at the University of Asia and the Pacific (formerly CRC). In June 1999 he became Professor Emeritus of the University.

In 1995 he received an award in the category of Books in English of the Catholic Mass Media Awards (CMMA), for his book Christ and the Moral Life. In February 1989 he received an award as Outstanding Catholic Author from the 2nd Asian Catholic Book Fair.

He was consultor to the late Cardinal Julio Rosales in the Pontifical Commission for the Revision of the Code of Canon Law, to the Papal Nuncio to the Philippines, Archbishop Bruno Torpigliani, and to Cardinal Jaime Sin, who appointed him delegate to the 1979 Synod of Manila, as expert in social ethics.

He was a member of the Fellowship of Catholic Scholars (USA), the American Catholic Philosophical Association (USA), the Society of Catholic Social Scientists (USA), the American Maritain Association (USA), of the Royal Institute of Philosophy (UK), the International Society for Study of European Ideas (Haifa, Israel), the Catholic Educators Resource Center (Canada), the Carnegie Council for Ethics in International Affairs (USA), and the Acton Institute for the Study of Religion and Liberty (USA).

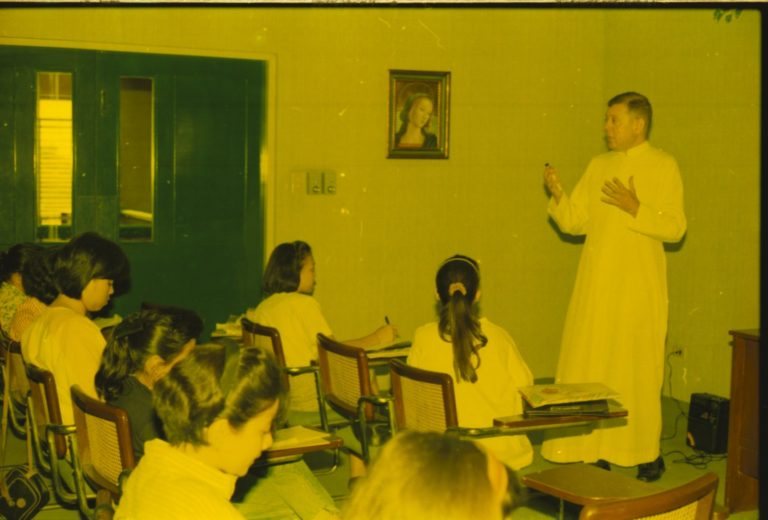
Fr. Joseph de Torre teaching a philosophy class at the Center for Research and Communication.

== Publications ==
He published more than twenty books and hundreds of articles and essays, since 1966, mainly on themes of Vatican II, as well as topics on social, biological, economic and political ethics, such as the person and the common good, the sacredness of human life, the family and the political community.

A book that has become a textbook is Christian Philosophy. Manila: Vera-Reyes, 1980 (Reprintings in 1981 and 1989); (332 pp.). Presentation by Jaime L. Cardinal Sin. ISBN 978-9715540551

His books on the social ethics and the social doctrine of the Church are:

- Freedom, Truth and Love: The Encyclical Centesimus Annus. Manila: SEASFI, 1992; (179 pp.). ISBN 9718527176
- The Church and Temporal Realities. 1st ed.: Manila: SEASFI, 1988; 2nd ed.: Manila: UA&P, 1997 (136 pp.). With a Foreword by Jaime L Cardinal Sin. ISBN 978-9718527085
- Politics and the Church: From Rerum Novarum to Liberation Theology. Manila: Vera-Reyes, 1985; (297 pp.). ISBN 9711510073
- Work, Culture, Liberation: The Social Teaching of the Church. Manila: Vera-Reyes, 1985 (275 pp.). ISBN 978-9711510046
- The Leaven of the Gospel in Secular Society. Manila: Sinag-tala, 1983; (120 pp.). With Presentations by Archbishop Bruno Torpigliani, former Apostolic Nuncio to the Philippines, and Archbishop Antonio Mabutas, President, Catholic Bishops' Conference of the Philippines. ISBN 971-15-1003-0
- (ed.) Social Morals: The Church Speaks on Society. 1st ed.: 1975; 2nd ed.: Manila: SEASFI, 1987; (218 pp.). With a Foreword by Archbishop Bruno Torpigliani, former Apostolic Nuncio to the Philippines. ISBN 9718527052
- Person, Family and State: An Outline of Social Ethics. Manila: SEASFI, 1991; (431 pp.). ISBN 978-9718527153
- Informal Talks on Family and Society. Manila: SEASFI, 1990; (155 pp.). ISBN 978-9718527115
- The Roots of Society. The Metaphysical Ground of Social Ethics. 1st ed.: 1977; 2nd ed.: Manila: Sinag-tala, (184 pp.). ISBN 978-6218002142
- (ed.) Population Matters: A Symposium. Manila: UA&P, 2002 (152 pp.).

On spirituality, he has written:

- Christ and the Moral Life. Manila: Sinag-tala, 1984; (87 pp.).
- The Divinity of Jesus Christ: Summary of Fundamental Theology in the Light of Vatican II. Manila: Sinag-tala, 1984; (166 pp.). Reprinted in 2002. With a Presentation by Jaime L. Cardinal Sin. ISBN 9711170205

His books on modern philosophy are:

- The Humanism of Modern Philosophy. 1st ed.: Manila: SEASFI, 2nd ed.: Manila, UA&P, 1997: (349 pp.). ISBN 978-9718527092
- William James: Pragmatism, Manila: SEASFI, 1990: (111 pp.). ISBN 9718527117
- Marxism, Socialism and Christianity. 1st ed.: Manila: SEASFI, 1976; 2nd ed.: On the centenary of Karl Marx's death, Manila: Sinag-tala, 1983; (130 pp.).
- Contemporary Philosophical Issues in Historical Perspective, Manila: UA&P, 2000; (275 pp.). Preface by Stephen Krason. ISBN 978-9719527534
- Generation and Degeneration: A Survey of Ideologies. Manila: UA&P, 1995 (214 pp.) ISBN 9718527249
- Openness to Reality: Essays on Secularism and Transcendence, Manila: UA&P, 1985; (151 pp.). ISBN 978-9718527252
- Being Is Person: Personalism and Human Transcendence in Socio-Economic and Political Philosophy. Manila: UA&P, 2005; (306 pp.). ISBN 978-9718527733

On family and bioethics, he wrote:

- Sexuality and Sanctity. 1st ed.: Manila: Sinag-tala, 1988; (166 pp.). Reprinted in 2002. ISBN 978-9711171063
- (ed.) Bioethical Questions: The Teaching of John Paul II. Manila: UA&P, 1999; (492 pp.).
- (ed.) The Church Speaks on Marriage and Celibacy. 1st ed.: 1976; 2nd ed.: Manila: Sinag-tala, 1984; (388 pp.)
