= César Ortiz-Echagüe =

Spanish architect (1927–2026)

- Ortiz-Echagüe in 2017
- Born: César Ortiz-Echagüe Rubio; 13 January 1927; Madrid, Spain
- Died: 27 September 2026 (aged 99); Madrid, Spain
- Education: Technical University of Madrid
- Occupations: Architect, priest
- Years active: 1953–2026
- Employer: University of Navarra
- Awards: Reynolds Memorial Award (1957); Ibero-American Prize for Architecture and Urbanism (2019)

César Ortiz-Echagüe Rubio (Note: In this Spanish name, the first or paternal surname is Ortiz-Echagüe and the second or maternal family name is Rubio.) (13 January 1927 – 27 September 2026) was a Spanish architect and priest. He was a member of Opus Dei and was ordained a priest by John Paul II in 1983. In 2019, he won the Ibero-American Prize for Architecture and Urbanism with Jorge Scrimaglio.

== Early life ==
César Ortiz-Echagüe Rubio was born in Madrid on 13 January 1927. He was the fourth of eight children of José Ortiz-Echagüe, an entrepeneur, and his wife, Carmen Rubio y Ganzarain. His uncle, Antonio Ortiz-Echagüe was also a notable Spanish painter. He grew up during the Spanish Civil War. In 1945, he became a member of Opus Dei while studying in university. He studied architecture at the Technical University of Madrid and graduated as an architect in 1952.

== Career ==
In 1955, Ortiz-Echagüe met Rafael Echaide when he was studying in Complutense University of Madrid. He designed many things and facilities for SEAT in Barcelona and Madrid. His most famous work was the SEAT factory dining hall in Barcelona, which he completed from 1953 to 1956. He earned the Reynolds Memorial Award from the American Institute of Architects in 1957.

In 1966, Ortiz-Echagüe decided to retire from being an architect to start his religious career. He moved to Rome to study philosophy. He became the regional vicar of Opus Dei in many countries throughout his career such as Germany, Estonia, and Sweden. On 22 May 1983, he was ordained as a priest by John Paul II.

== Personal life and death ==
In 2019, he was awarded the Ibero-American Prize for Architecture and Urbanism.

César Ortiz-Echagüe died in Madrid on 27 September 2026, at the age of 99.
