= Mario Maiolo =

Italian politician

Mario Maiolo was the Vice-President of the province of Cosenza, Italy. Maiolo is chairman of the Committee on Regional Development Plan. He was elected to the Regional Council on April 4, 2005. He belongs to the center-left Democracy is Freedom – The Daisy, which later merged with the Democratic Party. He was born in Cosenza in 1963.

He is an engineer and university professor at the Faculty of Engineering, University of Calabria. He is also the author of numerous scientific publications in the field of hydraulic construction and environmental engineering.

As a young boy began his political activism within the Catholic student movement. Then, he joined the Christian Democrats, and at its dissolution, the Italian People's Party and held the post of first secretary of the city of Cosenza.

From 1995 to 2004, he served as Vice President of the Province of Cosenza. Since 19 September 2006, he has been an adviser to national and international programming.

He is married and father of two children.
