= Banco Popular Español =

Spanish bank

Banco Popular Español S.A.
- Final logo designed by Brand Union used from 2015 to 2017.

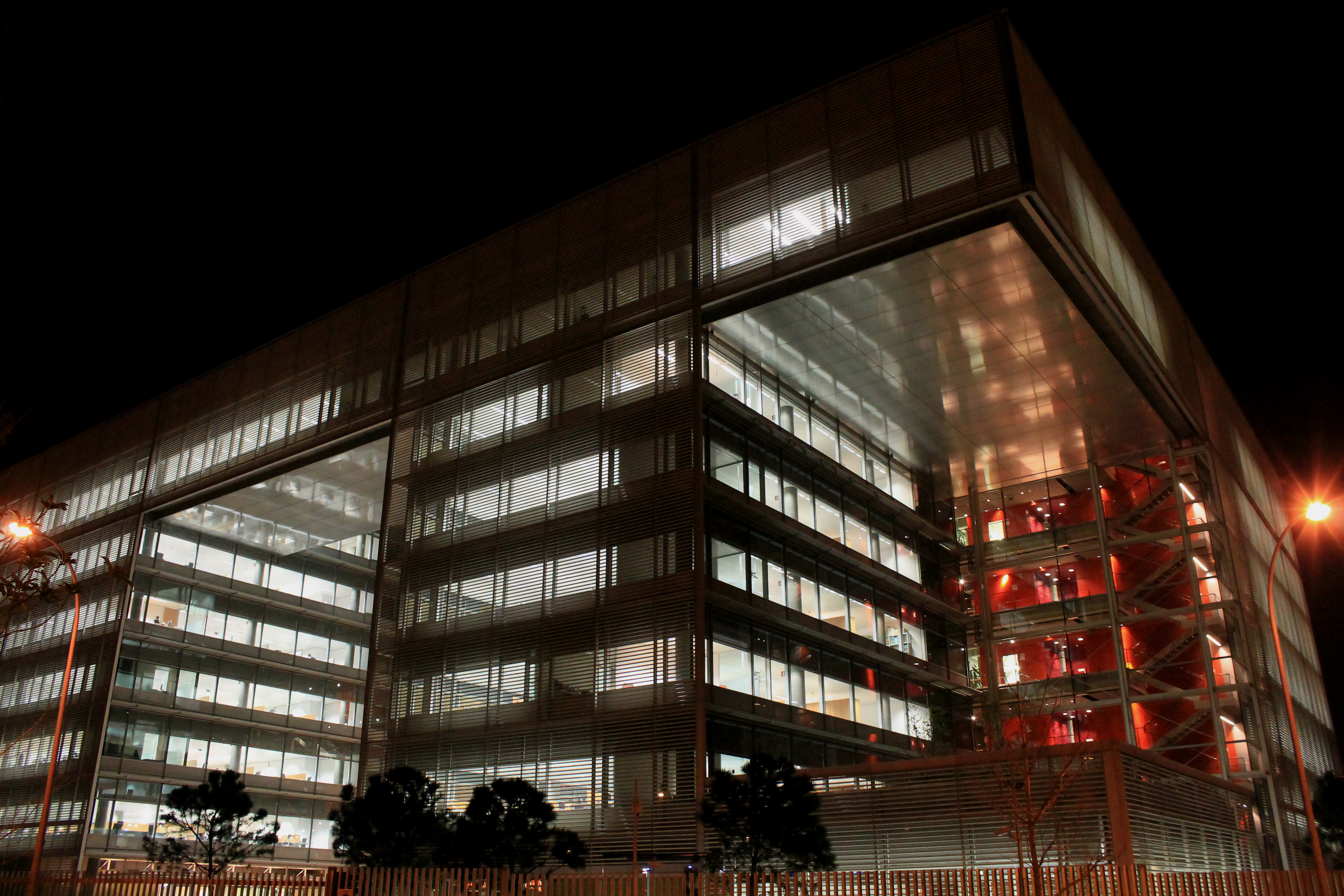
- Headquarters (Madrid, Spain)
- Type: Public
- Traded as: BMAD: POP
- Industry: Financial services
- Founded: 1926
- Defunct: 2017
- Fate: Merged into Banco Santander
- Headquarters: Madrid, Spain
- Products: Banking and insurance
- Website: www.bancopopular.es

Banco Popular Español, S.A. (Spanish pronunciation: [ˈbaŋko popuˈlaɾ espaˈɲol]) was the sixth largest banking group in Spain before it was bought by Banco Santander as part of a rescue package in June 2017.

== Components ==
The group consisted of the following companies:

- national bank: Banco Popular Español
- regional bank: Banco Pastor
- mortgage bank: Banco Popular Hipotecario
- private bank: Popular Banca Privada
- French subsidiary: Banco Popular France (sold to Crédit Mutuel in 2008)
- Portuguese subsidiary: Banco Popular Portugal
- USA subsidiary: TotalBank (now part of City National Bank of Florida)
- Internet bank: WiZink
- estate services subsidiary: Aliseda

The bank had international offices in Belgium, Chile, Germany, Hong Kong, Morocco, the Netherlands, Switzerland (Geneva and Zürich), London, the United States, France, Italy and Venezuela.

== History ==
Banco Popular Español (BPE) was founded in 1926. In 1968, BPE opened a representative office in Paris that became a subsidiary that by 1991 had a network of 14 branches in France. In 1992 BPE converted its subsidiary in France into a joint venture with Banco Comercial Português under the name Banco Popular Comercial. BPE established a network of branches in Portugal in 2000.

In 2002 BPE and Banco Comercial Português parted ways; Banco Popular Comercial becomes a wholly owned subsidiary of Banco Popular and changed its name to Banco Popular France.

In Portugal, Banco Popular bought Banco Nacional de Crédito (BNC) and transferred its existing branches there to BNC. Later, in 2005, BNC changed its name to Banco Popular Portugal.

In 2007 BPE bought a small bank in Southern Florida (United States of America) called TotalBank for US$300 million. The bank has 20 branches in Miami Dade County and more than 400 employees.

On 7 August 2009, Banco Popular Español acquired Banco de Andalucía, which was founded as Jerez de la Frontera in 1844 and had many services in the province of Cádiz, in the territorial area of Jerez de la Frontera, El Puerto de Santa María and Cádiz until 1959 when it expanded into the provinces of Seville and Huelva and changed its name to Banco de Andalucía. Spanish prosecutor José "Pepe" Grinda González believed Gennady Petrov (Russian: Геннадий Васильевич Петров) and his associates and entities related to them had bank accounts with Banco de Andalucía.

In 2017 SRM put Banco Popular under resolution process. All existing stocks and additional Tier 1 instruments were written down. Tier 2 instruments were converted into stocks and then sold to Banco Santander S.A. for €1. On 8 August 2017 it was announced that Banco Santander would sell its portion of Banco Popular's real estate business to the New York City-based private equity corporation Blackstone Group.

== See also ==
- Luis Valls-Taberner
- List of banks in Spain
