= Antonio Ortiz Echagüe =

Spanish painter (1883–1942)

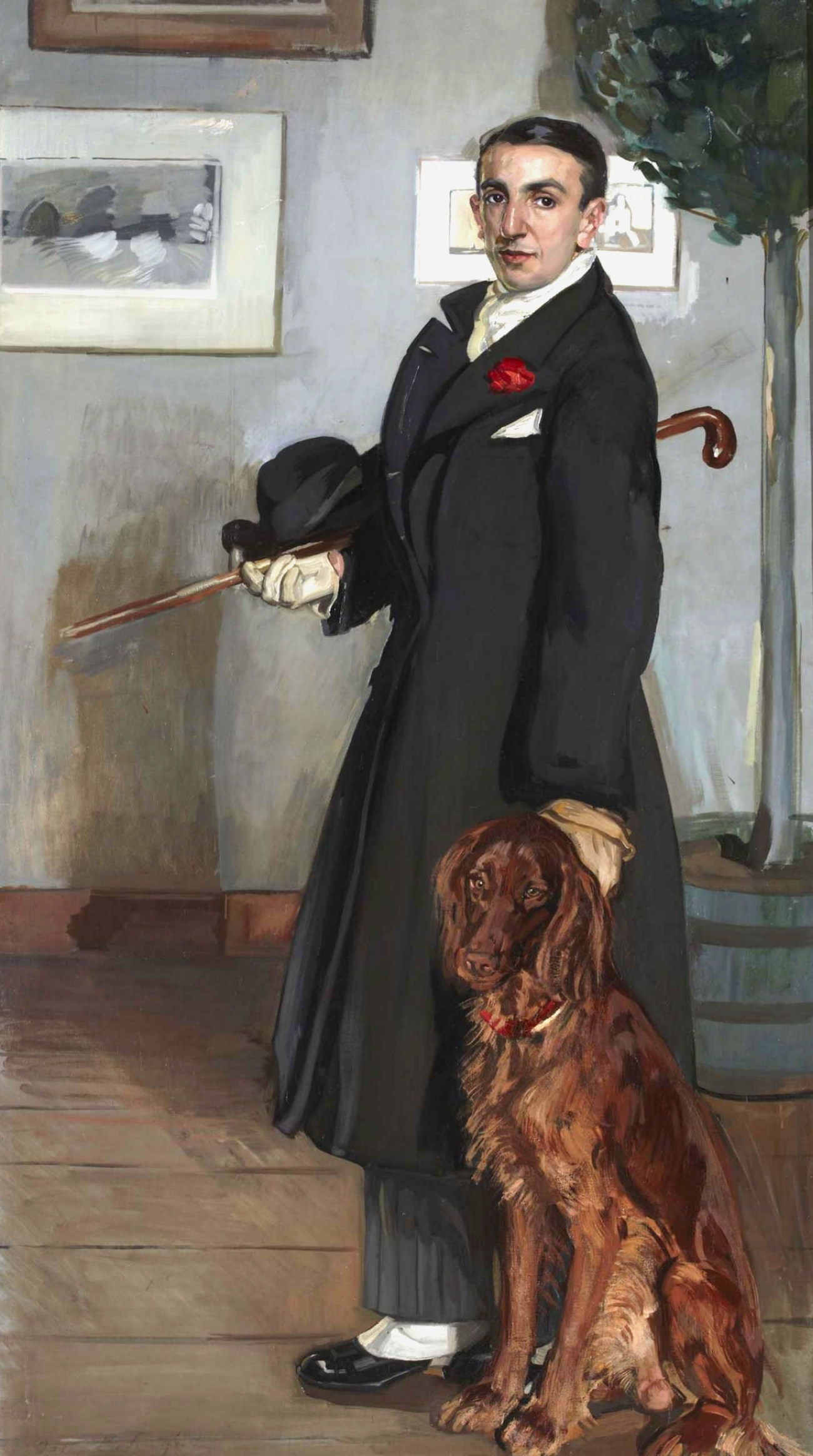
Self-portrait (1912)

Antonio Ortiz Echagüe (15 October 1883 – 8 January 1942) was a Spanish costumbrista painter, who spent much of his career in other countries. Alongside Ignacio Zuloaga and Joaquin Sorolla, he forms part of the trio of aces of Spanish costumbrist painting at the turn of the twentieth century. His paintings, which blended tradition with modernity, gained him recognition and international awards (including the gold medal at the 1923 Paris Salon), and are represented in museums in Europe, the United States and South America. A museum in Sardinia, Italy, and another in Argentina are named in his honour. He was the older brother of the photographer, engineer and entrepreneur José Ortiz Echagüe.

== Biography ==
Ortiz Echagüe was born Guadalajara, Spain. His father was a military engineer. But, rather than pursue a technical career like his brother José, he showed an early aptitude for art. His uncle, Francisco, was appointed a military attaché in Paris, and proposed that Antonio, then fourteen, accompany him there to study. This was approved. There, he attended the Académie Julian and the Académie des Beaux-Arts, where he studied with Léon Bonnat. During the summer of 1900 he went back home and painted his first important canvas "La misa de Narvaja" inside the church of a little village in the Spanish province of Alava. Later, he went to Rome, where he shared a studio with Federico de Madrazo y Ochoa and, in 1904, obtained a scholarship to study at the Academia de España de Roma. Altogether, he stayed in Rome for four years; spending part of his last year there in Sardinia, painting women in their curious native costumes. One of them Fiesta de la cofradía de Atzara won second medal at the International Exhibition of Munich ( 1909) and silver medal at Salon des artistes français in París, in 1921.

While in Rome, he met a Dutch family who commissioned a portrait of their daughter, Elisabeth Smidt (who would later become his wife). This prompted him to move to the Netherlands and settle in Hilversum, where he painted portraits and genre scenes with old fishermen or women with their traditional dresses. In 1910, in the Madrid National Exhibition of Fine Arts he received a Second Class prize for "La señora Jansen y sus amigas". This success enabled him to visit the United States and Argentina and display his works at several galleries there. At the beginning of World War I, he returned to Spain.

He married Elisabeth in 1919 and they spent some time in Granada, where he focused on panoramic landscapes and, once again, women in native costumes. During the 1920s, they alternated between Hilversum and Paris, where he maintained a studio. He held a solo exhibition at the Georges Petit Gallery, and the Salon presented him with a gold medal in 1923 for "Jacob Van Amstel en mi casa", which would also receive a First Class prize at Spanish National Exhibition in 1924. Later, he was named a Knight in the Order of Alfonso XII, and was commissioned to paint Alfonso XIII.

In 1926, he moved to Madrid and settled in Fuente del Berro; specializing in portraits of the aristocracy, including the royal family. He also traveled with his brother, José, seeking out landscapes and rural types as subjects for his paintings. Later, he was named President of the Asociación de Pintores y Escultores, and the Biblioteca Nacional de España organized his first major solo exhibition.

At the age of forty-five, he made a trip to Morocco and settled in Fez for two years; painting with bright colours Berber, senegalese and moroccan women, and the vendors at the souk, like "Mujeres azules de Tafilalet", "Senegalesas de frente" or "Moro notable" . His works were exhibited in Fez and Rabat and earned him an Order of Ouissan Alaouite Medal from the Moroccan sultan, Mohammed V. Upon returning home, he exhibited his Moroccan works in Madrid and Paris.

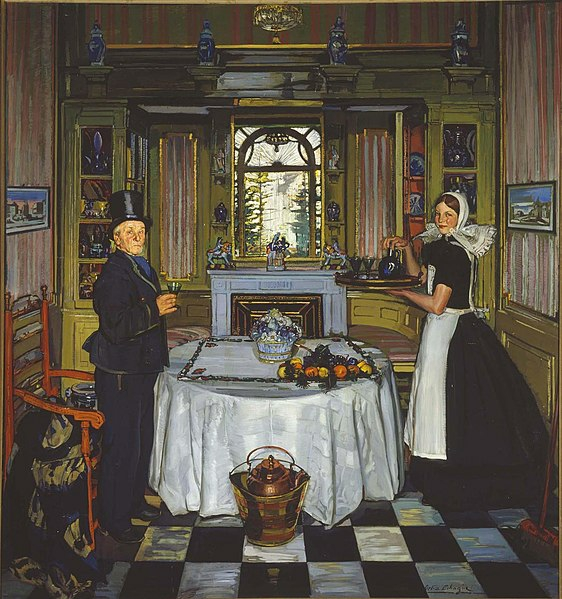
Jacob Van Amstel at My House

At the beginning of the 1930s, he moved to Argentina, where her wife owned a small farm outside Santa Rosa in La Pampa Province. When the Spanish Civil War began, he decided to stay in Argentina; a decision that was reinforced by the start of World War II. He continued to exhibit frequently in Buenos Aires and the United States; notably at the Carnegie Institute in 1940. That same year, he was named a corresponding member of the Real Academia de Bellas Artes de San Fernando. Two years later, he died in Buenos Aires of lung cancer, aged fifty-eight.

Ortiz Echagüe was a cosmopolitan artist and wide traveller, who focused on the representation of popular types from the different countries where he lived (Spain, Italy, Holland, France, Morocco, and Argentina). He captured figures directly from real life, true to size and without idealisations nor folklore, in a style characterised by precise draftsmanship, thick brushwork and a spectacular handling of light and colour. In contrast to his contemporaries, he painted the characters of other countries in the manner of Iberian realism, achieving something so apparently contradictory as the internationalisation of that regionalism so characteristic of Spanish painting in the late nineteenth century.

In 1991 the Spanish scholar and art teacher Montserrat Fornells Angelats presented her Ph.D. about Antonio Ortiz Echagüe at the University of Basque Country. Vitora, Spain.

In 1998, the "Museo atelier Antonio Ortiz Echagüe" was inaugurated at Santa Rosa, Argentina. Two years later, another museum dedicated to him was opened at Atzara, Sardinia, Italy: Museo d´Arte Moderna e Contemporanea Antonio Ortiz Echagüe (MAMA).
