= Luis Valls-Taberner =

Spanish banker (1926–2006)

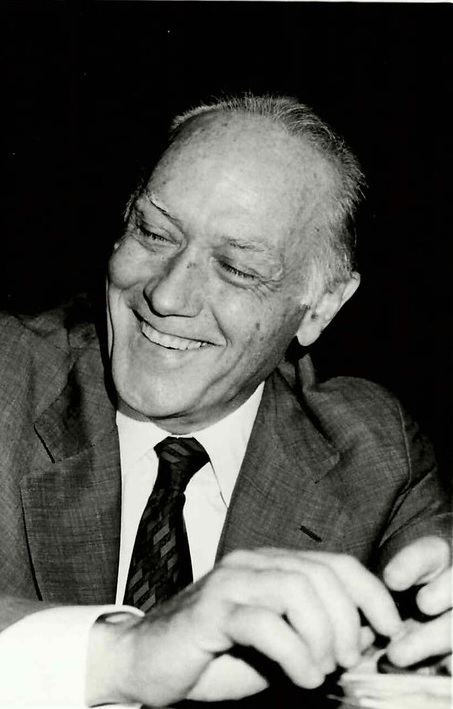
Luis Valls-Taberner

Luis Valls-Taberner (June 5, 1926 – February 25, 2006) was a Spanish financier. President of Banco Popular Español (1972–2004), he was also a professor at the Complutense University of Madrid and the University of Barcelona.

== Biography ==
=== Early years ===
He was born in Barcelona in 1926, into a family of the Catalan upper middle class with ties to politics, the textile industry, academic teaching and banking.

Luis was the fifth of six brothers, the youngest of whom, Javier, was co-president of Banco Popular Español with him for years. Two of his other brothers, Pedro and Félix, also worked at the Bank and helped Luis gain access to it by purchasing shares. However, the relative who was decisive in Luis' professional life was Félix Millet i Maristany, his mother's cousin, who was the president of Banco Popular and suggested Luis might replace him at the head of the financial institution.

Luis Valls-Taberner moved to Madrid at the age of twenty-one, where he would end up living the rest of his life. He began working at the Banco Popular de los Previsores del Porvenir, the genesis of Banco Popular Español, of which he would be vice president and president for almost five decades.

Valls-Taberner did not spend many years living there. When the Civil War broke out, the Valls family moved to Genoa (Italy), then lived in Córdoba and Logroño, finally returning to Barcelona in 1939. In 1948, he graduated from the Faculty of Law of the University of Barcelona and, a year later, he moved to Madrid to do his doctorate, whose thesis "The transfer of contracts in Spanish law" he presented in 1952.

At the age of twenty-one he applied to join Opus Dei (1946), a Catholic organization of which he remained a member until his death. This circumstance made him an atypical banker. Austere, supportive, freedom-loving and with a humanist spirit, Luis Valls was a very important figure in his Spain and one of the so-called Seven Greats of Banking. In January 1950 he visited Josemaría Escrivá in Rome.

He was a professor of political economy and public finance at the universities of Madrid and Barcelona between 1948 and 1956.

He eventually decided to change his professional orientation. After defending his doctoral thesis at the University of Madrid, he decided to enter the world of finance. After considering several other possibilities, his uncle, Félix Millet i Maristany, offered him a job at Banco Popular.

In the early sixties, Luis Valls started the Fomento de Actividades Culturales Económicas y Sociales, which became a meeting forum for diverse political outlooks, ensuring its financing through the Grupo Popular. Its main achievement at the time was the acquisition of the Madrid daily newspaper.

=== Career path ===
Luis Valls began working at Banco Popular in 1953. Four years later, in 1957, at the age of only 31, he was appointed executive vice-president. In 1972 he was appointed president of the financial institution, a position he held until 2004. After his retirement, he became Chairman of the Board of Shareholders.

When he joined the Bank, he undertook the separation of functions between administrators and managers, so that decisions (especially concerning the granting of loans) would be taken only on the basis of professional criteria. During the almost fifty years that he held an executive position at the Bank, he implemented a very personal style of banking, turning Banco Popular into a customer bank, specializing in SMEs. He promoted a flexible organization with few hierarchical steps.

At the head of Banco Popular, Luis Valls demonstrated a great capacity to adapt to changing circumstances and wanted to differentiate this bank from others by focusing on the customer. "The person is at the center" was his motto and he was committed to quality service. The satisfaction of those who came to a branch was another of his great concerns, and it was not in vain that Banco Popular was the first to have a customer service office, whose complaints Luis Valls attended to personally.

Not a friend of risks, his great concern as a banker was profitability and he defended the principle of transparency in everything he did. He once said: "Don’t say, write or do anything that can’t be published the next day in a newspaper." Other hallmarks of Banco Popular were solvency, efficiency and independence. All of these succeeded in placing Banco Popular at the top of several prestigious international rankings, year after year. It was named on several occasions as the most profitable bank in the world, a milestone reported in the December 1990 and January 1992 editions of Euromoney magazine.

Other larger banks expressed interest in acquiring Banco Popular. But Luis Valls always rejected the possible mergers and takeovers offered. To protect the entity, he strengthened the board of directors with the incorporation of prominent national and international businessmen who shared the bank's strategic vision.

Luis Valls Taberner resigned as director and chairman of the bank in October 2004, and Ángel Ron was appointed executive chairman by the Board of Directors. The death of Luis Valls in February 2006, who had retained the chairmanship of the shareholders' meeting, and the resignation of his brother Javier from the positions of director and co-chairman, meant that Ángel Ron remained as sole chairman of the bank.

He was the driving force behind the Spanish Private Banking Association, as well as an important promoter of Corporate Social Responsibility, creating several projects assisting people in need.

He was a member of Don Juan's Privy Council.

Luis Valls died in Madrid of renal failure at the age of 79, when he was recovering from the removal of several melanomas.

== Luis Valls and social action ==
Parallel to his activity at Banco Popular, he was very concerned about and engaged in social action. For Luis Valls, professional work could and should be carried out on solid pillars based on personal ethics. All this led him to develop from the bank and the foundations he promoted, a work of corporate social responsibility ahead of its time.

He had an open and friendly temperament, which led to forming many friendships with people from a variety of political outlooks. He had good friends in political parties far removed from his own political convictions (close to the Christian Democrats). Among others, Luis Solana, a politician of the socialist PSOE party, dedicated an obituary to him in which he expressed his friendship in the newspaper La Razón; while Antonio Gutiérrez, a trade union leader and secretary general of Comisiones Obreras, recounted the favorable impression he made on him when they met in 1987 and the friendship they kept up over the years. As a banker, he took this independence to its ultimate consequences, his being the first bank - for a time, the only one - that granted credit to the Communist Party before the general elections of 1979.

From his office in the Beatriz Building in Madrid he promoted many social assistance foundations in various fields: scholarships for students, cultural and research institutions, support for diocesan and religious institutions, and social welfare and development projects, He donated part of his salary to these projects and convinced some of his co-workers to donate the annual fees to which they were entitled to social work. Some of these foundations (Hispánica, Patronato Universitario and Fomento de Fundaciones) continue their social assistance efforts in the 21st century.

Valls-Taberner did not want to publicize the financial aid granted by Banco Popular, so as not to draw attention to himself. But at times it was mentioned in the press, as in an article by journalist Joana Bonet, published in the newspaper La Vanguardia, about financial assistance provided by Luis Valls Taberner himself to Enrique de Castro, a priest and activist, to assist the needs of his parishioners in the Madrid church of San Carlos Borromeo, in Entrevías.

=== Media criticism ===
In 2024 criticism arose in the media about the relationship between Luis Valls-Taberner and Opus Dei, due to the fact that Valls-Taberner freely chose to allocate some of his personal resources to assist social initiatives inspired by Opus Dei. Indeed, Valls helped to create several foundations, some of which received donations from Banco Popular: the bank’s board members freely waived their statutory rights and earmarked the money for social action.

Miguel Ángel Prieto, former director of Banco Popular's Chairman's Office, who worked closely with Luis Valls in the selection of projects to support through social action, recalls that they worked closely with other foundations: "They were social assistance foundations, in the fields of education, the advancement of women, cultural projects, the integration of immigrants, people with disabilities." These foundations provided financial support to various initiatives promoted by Opus Dei, as well as to many other social initiatives that had no link with it. The financial aid was provided in a legal manner, and generally in the form of loans that have been repaid.

=== Other concerns ===
Passionate about journalism, Luis Valls published articles in various newspapers, In the opinion of journalist Fernando González Urbaneja, these article were filled with subtle and incisive observations.

Valls helped to save a village, Morillo de Tou (Huesca), which was in the area affected by the Confederación Hidrográfica del Ebro, in collaboration with the trade union Comisiones Obreras. Valls-Taberner offered them a soft credit at low interest rates.

== Bibliography ==
=== Works of Luis Valls ===
==== Books ====
- La cesión de contratos en el derecho español, Barcelona, Bosch, 1955, 1ª, 105 pp.

==== Articles ====
- «El diario Madrid», ABC. 28/10/1973
- «El rey no gobierna», ABC. 16/12/1975
- «La carta robada», ABC. 09/11/1976
- «El reto de un ministro», ABC. 20/09/1973
- «El horizonte del nuevo Gobierno», YA. 11/01/1974
- «Las familias políticas», ABC. Abril de 1974
- «¿Quiénes nos gobernaran?», ABC. 10/02/1976
- «Flaco servicio al Rey», ABC. 25/04/1976
- «La banca también prospera en regímenes democráticos», EL PAÍS. 05/12/1976
- «Sobre el comportamiento de la Banca», ABC. 01/06/1980
- «Sobre la reforma de la Banca», ABC. 29/07/1980
- «Una dedicatoria de los Bancos al Ayuntamiento de Madrid», ABC. 12/11/1980
- «Los banqueros españoles caminan hacia la “reserva”», EL PAÍS. 20/02/1981
- «¿También la banca?», EL PAÍS. 06/03/1981
- «Sobre aspirinas y fusiones», FUTURO EMPRESARIAL. Marzo de 1988
- «Auge y caída de la banca», EL PAÍS. 09/10/1990
- «El Popular es un libro siempre abierto», EL NUEVO LUNES. 18/02/1991
- «Banco Popular: dos años de presidencia doble», ABC. 10/06/1991
- «De la Banca tranquila a la Banca inquieta», ECONOMÍA Y FINANZAS. Junio de 1993
- «Optimistas y pesimistas», DINERO. 20/12/1993
- «Libertad, esa gran señora». DIARIO 16. 27/03/1981
- «La calumnia», ABC. 29/01/1986
- «Diez sobre diez»,TIEMPO. 16/10/1989
- «El sello de Luis Valls», FUTURO EMPRESARIAL. Octubre de 1990
- «La trayectoria de Pepe», EL MUNDO. 20/01/1992
- «Rumasa: la historia llega a su fin», ABC. 20/02/1997
- «¿Sabe usted cómo se comporta?», Ya Dominical. 25/10/1981
- «Por qué nos reunimos los banqueros», Expansión. 13/10/1989
- «El pensamiento cautivo», DINERO. 1981
- «Mercaderes de dinero», ANUARIO EL PAÍS. 1986
- «La doble presidencia representa un logro organizativo que suma eficacia a la gestión», ABC. 01/05/1989
- «La organización será decisiva», Expansión. 29/05/1990
- «La cultura del “cómo” en la banca actual», CINCO DÍAS. 31/03/1993

=== About Luis Valls ===
- Tortella Casares, Gabriel, et al. (ed.), Historia del Banco Popular: la lucha por la independencia, Madrid, Marcial Pons, 2011, 1ª, 431 pp. ISBN 9788497689175.
- Valls-Taberner Muls, Luis, Desapego y libertad: apuntes de un banquero inclasificable, Argentina-España, Indicios, 2016, 1ª, 127 pp. ISBN 9788415732167.
