= Francisco Javier López Díaz (theologian) =

The Reverend Fr. Francisco Javier Lopez Diaz
- Theologian, professor
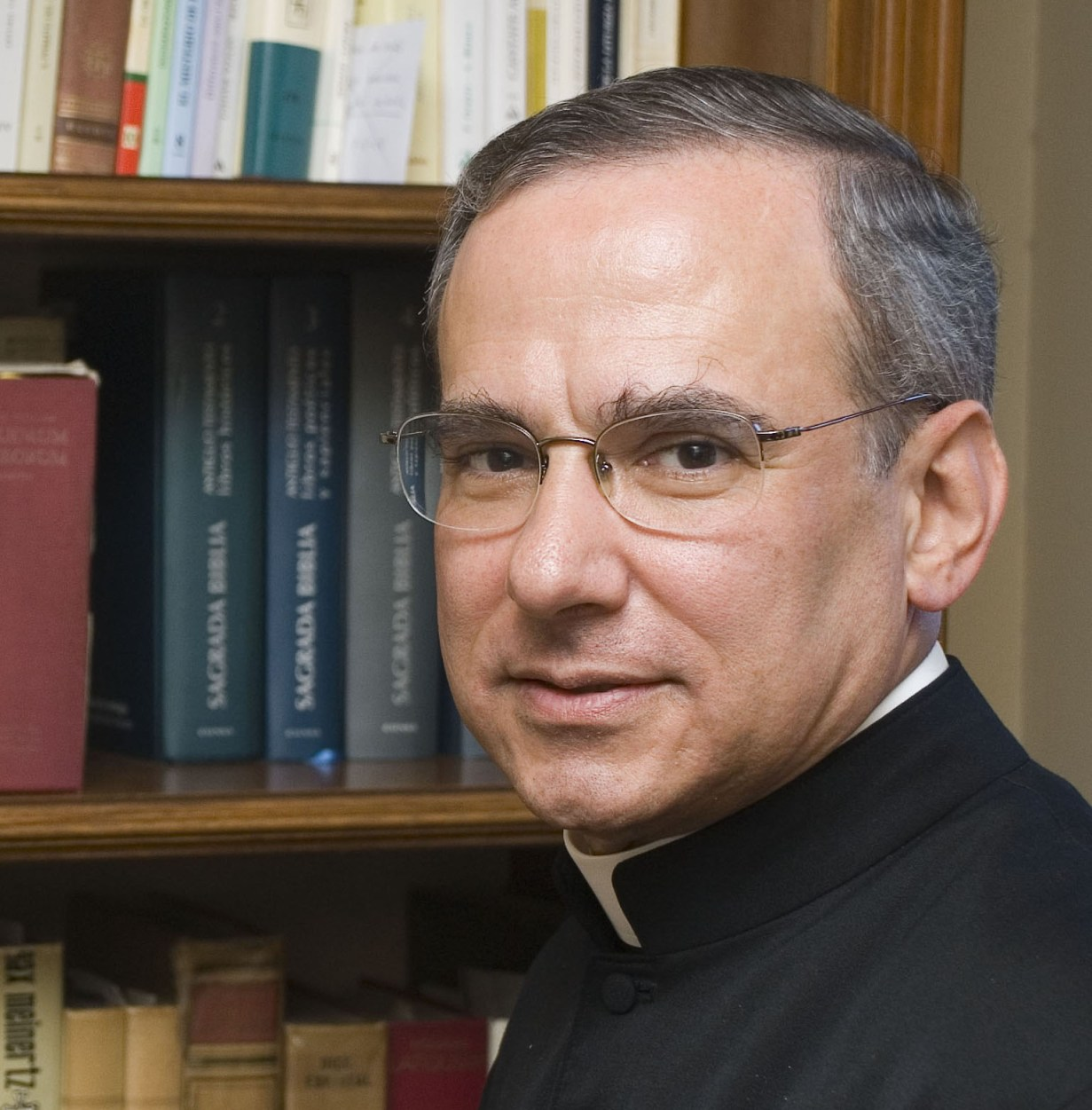
- Javier in 2008
- Church: Catholic
- See: Opus Dei

Orders
- Ordination: 21 August 1977

Personal details
- Born: 12 June 1949 (age 77) Madrid, Spain
- Denomination: Catholic (Roman Rite)

Francisco Javier López Díaz (born June 12, 1949) is a Spanish theologian and a priest of the Catholic Church incardinated in the personal prelature of Opus Dei. He currently teaches at the Pontifical University of the Holy Cross in Rome.

== Life ==
Born in Madrid, López Díaz began his studies at the Polytechnic school of the Complutense University of Madrid where he obtained a degree in aeronautical engineering (1971), and wrote his thesis on specialty engines (1972).

In 1973, he moved to Rome where he studied Theology. On August 21, 1977 he was ordained a priest of Opus Dei. In 1978, he obtained a Doctorate in Sacred Theology at the University of Navarre, having written his thesis on "The Identification with Christ according to Saint Thomas."

In 1978, he became a professor of studium generale at the Prelature of Opus Dei. He specialized in the study of the teachings of St. Josemaría Escrivá, especially on the teachings on the vocation and mission of the laity.

In 2005, he was joined the faculty of professors at the Pontifical University of the Holy Cross, where he currently acts as professor of Spiritual Theology and, since 2013, chair of the works of St. Josemaría Escrivá.

In 2010, he co-authored with Ernst Burkhart the book "Ordinary Life and Holiness in the Teaching of St. Josemaría"(Ed. Scepter, New York 2018) which is the largest and most systematic exposee on St. Josemaría Escrivá, who was defined by Pope John Paul II as the "saint of the ordinary" for having taught on sanctifying one's daily professional, familial, and social lives. He's also the author of more than 30 theological articles.

== Major works ==
- La identificación con Cristo según Santo Tomás. Pamplona, 2003.
- Vida cotidiana y santidad en la enseñanza de san Josemaría (with Ernst Burkhart), 3 vols. (623 pp.; 527 pp.; and 677 pp.), Rialp, Madrid, 2010-2013. Four editions.
- (ed.) San Josemaría e il pensiero teologico, 2 vols. (492 pp. and 440 pp.), Edusc, Rome, 2014-2015.
