= José Ortiz-Echagüe =

Spanish entrepreneur (1886–1980)

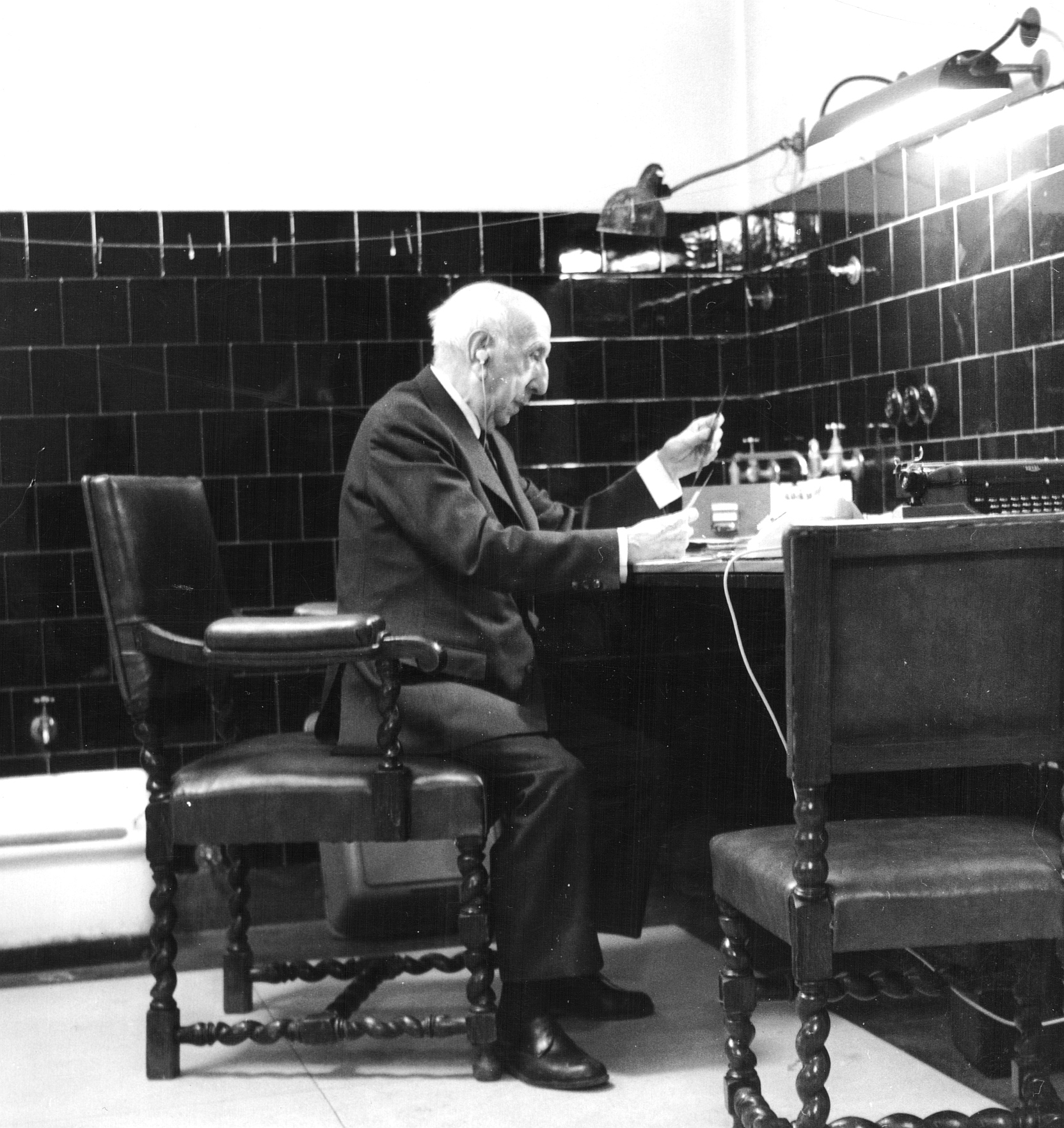
- José Ortiz-Echagüe in his home laboratory
- Born: José Ortiz-Echagüe Puertas; 2 August 1886; Guadalajara, Spain
- Died: 7 September 1980 (aged 94); Madrid, Spain
- Known for: Photography
- Movement: Pictorialism
- Spouse: Carmen Rubio

José Ortiz-Echagüe (2 August 1886 in Guadalajara – 7 September 1980 in Madrid) was a Spanish entrepreneur, industrial and military engineer, pilot and photographer, founder of Construcciones Aeronáuticas SA (CASA) and Honorary lifetime President of SEAT (Sociedad Española de Automóviles de Turismo). He was also nominated Gentilhombre de cámara con ejercicio (Gentleman of the Bedchamber) during the reign of the King of Spain Alfonso XIII.

== Biography ==
José Ortiz-Echagüe was the second child of the military engineer Antonio Ortiz and his wife Dolores Echagüe. The couple had two daughters and five sons, one of whom died young as a military aspirant. At his birth, José's father was a professor at the Academy of Military Engineers in Guadalajara. When the father, three years later, was appointed chief of the military garrison in Logroño, the capital of La Rioja, the family moved to Logroño, where José grew up and went to school. He used to consider himself a 'riojano'.

His three-year older brother, Antonio Ortiz-Echagüe, wanted to be a painter, even though in the family of the father and the mother there had been no known artists but several militaries. Antonio was therefore sent to Paris, and over the years he became an internationally known portrait painter of the early twentieth century. His work is found in an entire dedicated room in the Museo San Telmo in San Sebastián, where their parents lived after the retirement of their father.

In the beginning José Ortiz-Echagüe had wanted to become a painter too. He discovered the art of photography at the age of 12, when he received as a present his first photographic camera from an uncle who was military attaché in Paris: a Kodak camera with which he took his first photographs and began to develop his artistic talent. In 1903, he took a photograph in La Rioja during the sermon in a village church ('Sermon en la aldea'), for which he received the first prize in the following year at an exhibition in Vitoria. Already in 1904, the Spanish photography magazine 'Graphos Ilustrado' published a report on his photographs.

But being the son of an Andalusian military engineer and to respect his father's will since their finances did not allow sending a second son to Paris, in 1903 he joined the Academy of Military Engineers in Guadalajara. Thereupon his training and graduation, he served in the balloon unit during the Spanish-Moroccan War in North Africa. He acquired his aerostat and aircraft pilot license in 1911, becoming the third Spanish man awarded it. Another distinction came in 1914, when he flew – along with Captain Herrera – first over the Strait of Gibraltar. In 1916 he married Carmen Rubio in Madrid. The marriage resulted in eight children.

Between 1909 and 1916, while he had moved to the Spanish Protectorate of Morocco, he started his photographic documentary passion, which he continued on his return to Spain. In his images, he captured not only landscapes and monuments but also human beings as well as their rituals.

As an entrepreneur and an engineer, he is renowned for his work in the fields of aviation and automobiles. The beginning of his activity in the aircraft manufacturing business was in 1913 during his attempt to fly a Morane-Saulnier from Paris to Madrid. When the plane caught fire, Ortiz-Echagüe not only managed to rescue himself as well as the engine undamaged, but he also brought it to Morocco and – in the middle of a military operation – used this for the construction of a new aircraft. After his final return from North Africa, he founded in 1923 the aircraft manufacturer Construcciones Aeronáuticas SA (CASA) in Seville (licensed manufacturer by Bücker, Dornier, Heinkel, Junkers; today its successor EADS CASA is a partner in the construction of Airbus aircraft as a branch of EADS).

Later, in 1950, he established the first assembly line Spanish car maker 'Sociedad Española de Automóviles de Turismo S.A.' (S.E.A.T. S.A.), becoming its first president, later its executive president until 1976, when he was named honorary lifetime president of the car company (since 1986 SEAT has been a subsidiary of the Volkswagen group).

Being a pioneer throughout his life, in 1959, once again he was flying at the age of 72 years as a co-pilot in an F-100 Sabre of the United States Air Force, which – as happened at that time with all American combat aircraft in Europe – had been repaired at the CASA factory. He was by then the oldest person to fly at supersonic speed.

== Photographic work ==
Ortiz-Echagüe believed strongly on the one hand that Spain must modernize itself in accordance with the spirit of the times – inter alia by founding industrial companies – but on the other hand was well aware that a broad modernization could lead to disappearance of traditional clothing, a change in the villages and even a transformation of the landscape. He wanted at least to capture with his camera and hold this cultural heritage, before the change occurred.

=== Aesthetics ===
In the field of artistic photography, he is perhaps the most popular photographer in Spain and one of the most well known abroad. In 1935 the magazine 'American Photography' named him one of the top three photographers in the world, while some critics have also considered him to be one of the best Spanish photographers to date. This recognition becomes even more meritorious when it is considered that photography was a hobby to which he only devoted his spare time, especially during weekends and his various trips.

From an artistic point of view one might consider him as a representative of the generation of '98 in photography, but he is also often included within the photographic movement of pictorialism, being in fact the best known representative of the Spanish photographic pictorialism, even though this late definition never liked to Ortiz-Echagüe. His photographic work focuses on portraying the most defining characteristics of a people, their customs and their traditional costumes as well as locations. He managed to project through his pictures a personal expression which is closer to painting, often using effects during photo processing. Echagüe remained faithful throughout his life to the aesthetics and techniques of pictorialism, including using gum bichromate and coal.

=== Working technique ===
Since 1898 when he got his first camera, he took thousands of photographs entirely in black-and-white. He exposed his negatives using a special technique similar to the carbon printing one ('carbón fresson') which was the mainstream practice during his youth. Soon its use would become outdated, however he followed that technique throughout his art, giving a special hue and a greater contrast result to his positives, which now makes his work easily recognizable.

Both paper-making as well as the procedure of obtaining photographs required a lot of patience, an extraordinary ability and a perfect management of that particular technique. Therefore, over the years and as photographic processes would become more simplified and automated, the few photographers still using this technique would tend to abandon it.

The sheet had a thin layer of gelatin onto which was added a black pigment and it was sensitized to light. The photographer obtained his copies under a process based on the principle that in the parts of the image receiving less light the gelatin would remain soft whereas in the parts of the image receiving more light the gelatin would become hardened. The treatment of the copy – bathing in water and sawdust – dissolved the unhardened gelatin together with the pigment onto it revealing a white zone underneath, while the hardened gelatin resisted the bathing process, trapping the pigment inside and subsequently producing black areas. In this way the image on paper was exposed. But furthermore this printed image with the paper still wet, could be retouched using brushes and cotton swabs or scrapers, giving a lot of freedom for creativity.

The ability to intervene in the outcome of a photograph, the greater richness of tones given from the pigment and its stability were the main reasons that Jose Ortiz-Echagüe used this technique. Nevertheless, this archaic method is not considered to be the strongest component in his images. Without an intriguing subject, a good composition, well directed lights on models and the correct layout of the scene, the procedure of coal placed directly to Fresson paper would give a vulgar result.

=== Cameras ===
At the age of 12 Ortiz received his first camera, a present from an uncle: it was a Kodak camera which took 6 plates in 8 × 6.6 cm format.

His second camera, which he got three years later, also a gift from a relative, and which he was using for five years, was a 'Photo Esphère' for glass plates in 9 x 12 cm format.

In the years from 1903 to 1909, he used a 9 × 12 cm folding camera and a 15 × 18 cm travel camera with a wooden stand.

The shots of costumes he captured were taken with a 13 × 18 cm travel camera with a Hermagis Eidoscope lens and a focal length of 26 cm (Lens speed f/5).

In 1934 he used – especially for landscape shots – a 9 × 12 cm reflex camera and several lenses with focal lengths from 13 to 45 cm.

In his last 20 years (until 1970), he used simultaneously, a Linhof Technika and – at that time press photographers were very popular in the USA – a Graflex Speed Graphic camera.

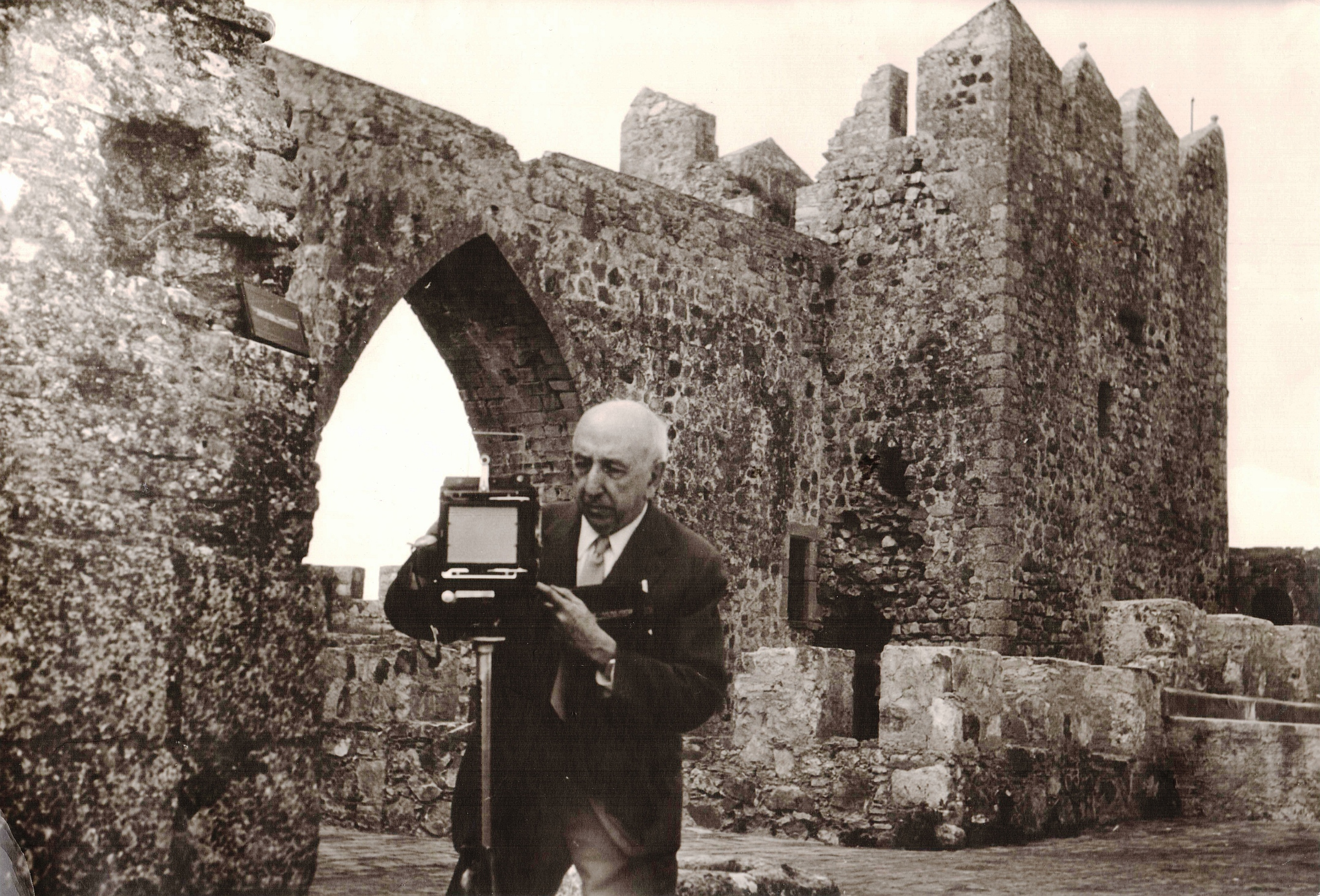
José Ortiz-Echagüe in the 1960s adjusting his camera in front of some ruins in Avila, Spain

=== Publications ===
Ortiz-Echagüe himself made a classification of his works by grouping them into four books:

- 'Tipos y Trajes' (1930)

In the series of 'Tipos y Trajes' (Characters and Outfits) we contemplate a Spanish society of a great folklore, yet we see portraits of a great human depth. It is hard not to be impressed by certain looks and behaviors of the characters portrayed, popular personages from streets in Spanish cities.

- 'España, Pueblos y Paisajes' (1939)

In 'España, Pueblos y Paisajes' (Spain, Peoples and Landscapes) we see, beyond the mere reproduction of the monument or the landscape, the contrast between lands and peoples.

- 'España Mística' (1943)

The series on 'España Mística' (Mystical Spain) focuses in cloistered religious communities and popular devotions such as pilgrimages and processions. In this series he presents portraits of monks reminiscent of Zurbarán or El Greco monks.

- 'España, Castillos y Alcázares' (1956)

The 'España, Castillos y Alcázares' (Spain, Castles and Palaces) group could be considered a subcategory out of the series 'España, Pueblos y Paisajes', but even if it is characterized by extreme dedication, there are very few examples of this series one of them being in possession of his friend Francisco Benito, server and family confidant in Madrid.

To these collections two more series should be added:

- 'Marruecos'

The 'Marruecos' (Morocco) series was realized during his stay between 1909 and 1916 as a military engineer in the Spanish Protectorate of Morocco.

- 'Fotos familiares'

The 'Fotos familiares' (Family photos) are portraits realized for his family, many of which are of such high quality as those mentioned above.

The values of his works are evident: the beauty and the magnificence of his photographs, the delicacy and the sensitiveness of his settings, his respect and affection for the traditional personas being portrayed. His photographs still provoke the same fascination as the time they were taken.

His work has been republished many times, and has been exhibited in many places worldwide. He received many awards during his lifetime, both in Spain and abroad.

Most of his work is kept in the 'Legado Ortiz-Echagüe' (Ortiz-Echagüe Legacy), in the University of Navarra, which holds approximately 1,000 original compositions performed under the 'carbón fresson' technique, and more than 20,000 negatives. The 'Museo del Traje' (Museum of Outfits) in Madrid, under the 'Centro de Investigación del Patrimonio Etnológico' (Ethnological Heritage Research Center), preserves a good collection of photographs from the series 'Tipos y Trajes', acquired in 1933.

=== Retrospective exhibitions ===
In Berlin in 1929 an exhibition of his photographs was held and after that, his book 'Spanische Köpfe – Bilder aus Kastilien, Aragonien und Andalusien' was published.

The Metropolitan Museum of Art in New York City organized in 1960 a retrospective exhibition entitled 'Spectacular Spain', in which Ortiz-Echagüe appeared alongside artists such as Goya. This exhibition displayed eighty photographs of Ortiz-Echagüe.

In 1998 the University of Navarra, owner of a great part of Ortiz-Echagüe's photographic collection, based on the selection made by the Metropolitan Museum of Art, organized a retrospective exhibition of photographs, spanning some sixty years of production until 1964. Since 1998 this selection has travelled around various museums and exhibitions, including the 'Museu Nacional d'Art de Catalunya' (National Art Museum of Catalonia), the Hôtel de Sully in Paris (an exhibition entitled 'Mirages of Spain' in 1999), the 'Sala de Armas de la Ciudadela de Pamplona' (Hall of Arms of the Pamplona Citadel), the 'Museo Nacional Centro de Arte Reina Sofía' (National Art Museum Reina Sofía) (the latter exceeding 150,000 visitors), the 'Palacio del Infantado' (Palace of Infantado') in Guadalajara, or even the 'Sala Amós Salvador' (Hall of Amós Salvador) in Logroño.

== Bibliography ==
- Frédérique Chapuis, « Un grand d'Espagne », Télérama n° 2561, 10 février 1999, p. 44
- Ortiz-Echagüe, Madrid: Tf. Editores-LaFábrica, 1998 (Catálogo publicado con motivo de la exposición antológica), ISBN 84-95183-00-5
- Asunción Domeño: Ortiz-Echagüe, notario de la tradición, Madrid : La Fábrica, 2005, ISBN 84-96466-02-7
- Asunción Domeño: La fotografía de José Ortiz-Echagüe: técnica, estética y temática, Pamplona : Gobierno de Navarra, Departamento de Educación y Cultura, 2000, ISBN 84-235-2042-0
- Ortiz Echagüe. Editores-La Fábrica, Madrid 1998, ISBN 84-95183-00-5 (Retrospective exhibition catalog)
- Jose Ortiz-Echagüe: Spanien. Landschaften u. Portraits 1903 – 1964. Translated from Spanish by Susanne Felkau. Schirmer/Mosel Verlag, München 1979, ISBN 3921375363
- Javier Ortiz-Echagüe: NORTE DE ÁFRICA, Ortiz Echagüe. Editores-La Fábrica, Madrid 2013, ISBN 978-84-8043-259-7 (Catalogue of exhibition in Museu Nacional D’Art de Catalunya)
