= João Carlos Martins =

Brazilian pianist and conductor

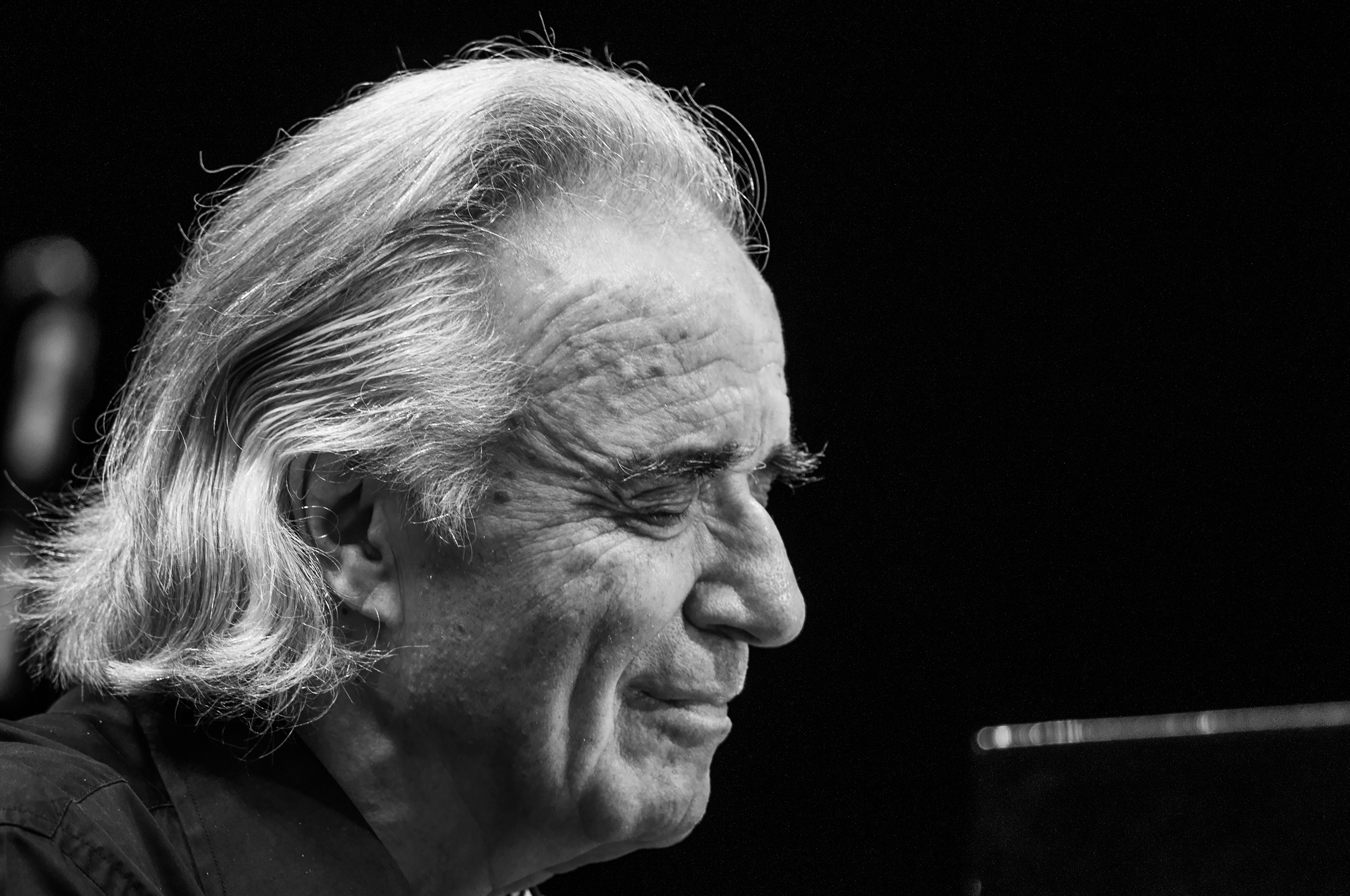
João Carlos Martins

João Carlos Gandra da Silva Martins (Portuguese pronunciation: [ʒuˈɐ̃w ˈkaʁluz maɾˈtʃĩs]); born June 25, 1940) is a Brazilian classical pianist and conductor, who has performed with leading orchestras in the United States, Europe and Brazil.

He is celebrated as an interpreter of Bach and has recorded his complete keyboard works. For decades Martins has been engaged as the leading pianist at the Boston Symphony, the Los Angeles Philharmonic and other ensembles. The New York Times wrote, "Maestro Martins has lived a life of renown, challenge, tenacity and triumph sufficient to fill a lively memoir".

After his career as a concert pianist was derailed by injuries and accidents, he successfully reinvented himself as a conductor, leading hundreds of performances worldwide including acclaimed concerts at Carnegie Hall. He is a conductor at the English Chamber Orchestra and the Bachiana Filarmonica Orchestra. He has also founded social programs for underprivileged youth in Latin America.

== Early life ==
A child prodigy, Martins began studying the piano with José Kliass at the age of eight. The following year, he won a competition sponsored by the Bach Society of Brazil. Soon thereafter, Alfred Cortot proclaimed: "With this kind of tone, with the ability of his fingers, he could become very important for the history of piano playing."

At the age of 18, he was among the first Latin Americans to be invited to participate in the prestigious Casals Music Festival in Puerto Rico. International attention grew in 1961 when, aged 20, he performed at his debut concert in Washington, D.C., Bach's 48 Preludes and Fugues from the Well-Tempered Clavier (a work that became one of his specialties). The reviewers were ecstatic.

He was already well known in Brazil as a child prodigy, and his name quickly spread throughout the concert world. Three years later he made his New York debut, followed by engagements with major orchestras in the United States, and recitals throughout the world, including sold-out performances at Carnegie Hall and Avery Fisher Hall (Lincoln Center).

== Performing and conducting career ==
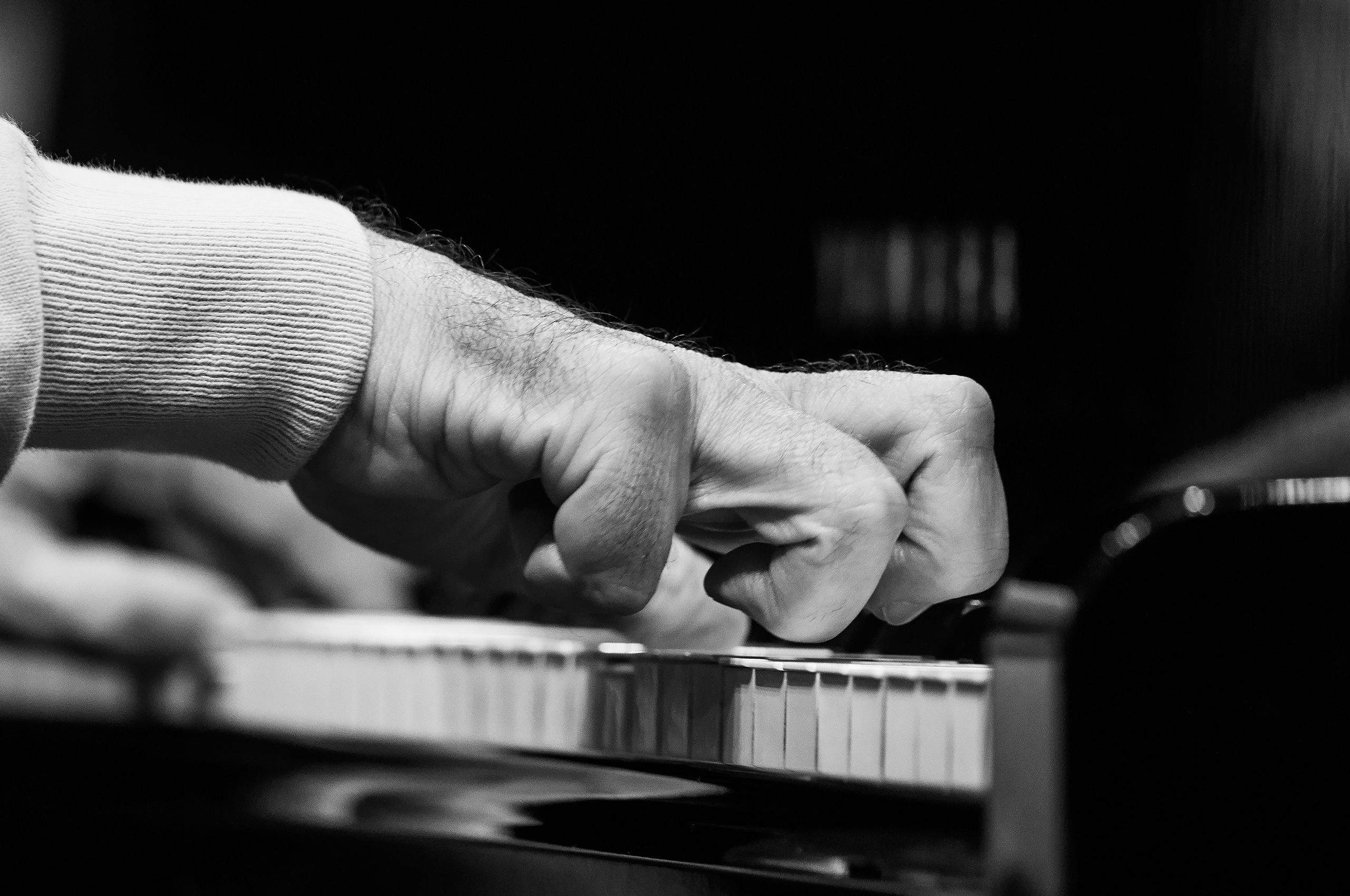
His hands

Recordings of Book I & II of the Well-Tempered Clavier, for the Connoisseur Society label, followed soon thereafter and in 1968 RCA released Alberto Ginastera's Piano Concerto with Martins and the Boston Symphony under Erich Leinsdorf: a widely acclaimed first recording of this work, which appeared for weeks on Billboard's best seller list. He became a regular at the Peabody Mason Concert series and Boston Symphony.

Between 1979 and 1998, Martins devoted himself to recording Bach's complete works for keyboard on the Concord Concerto and Labor Records labels. His collection of the complete keyboard works of Bach - a 20 CD edition released on the Concord Concerto label, and the most extensive series of Bach keyboard recordings by a single pianist - resulted in spectacular reviews throughout the world, including feature articles and cover stories in some of the most prestigious music magazines.

In 1981, he was appointed Brazil's Secretary of Culture.

While visiting Bulgaria in 1995, Martins was attacked by two thugs, receiving injuries to his skull and brain, and lost the use of his right arm. After undergoing numerous treatments, including a new version of biofeedback therapy on his right arm, he played a comeback concert in Carnegie Hall in 1996, appearing as soloist with the American Symphony Orchestra, performing Ravel and Ginastera.

In early 2000, he underwent an unsuccessful operation in his right hand, which rendered his hand essentially useless. Instead of retiring completely from the piano, Martins continued to play using his left hand and one finger of the right hand.

After his career as a pianist finished due to problems which later developed in his left hand, he turned to conducting, despite very limited hand-movements. Since then he has led hundreds of performances worldwide including concerts at Carnegie Hall.

In 2020, he returned to playing with both hands with the help of a pair of bionic gloves. They were especially developed for him by the Brazilian industrial designer Ubiratan Bizarro Costa.

Harold C. Schonberg, Pulitzer-winning music critic of the New York Times, said, "His technique sends fireworks in all directions... he does everything with extraordinary élan." The Boston Globe characterized him as "The most exciting player of Bach on the modern piano to emerge since Glenn Gould," and National Public Radio described Martins' Bach as "in the same tradition of, say, Furtwängler's Beethoven or Bernstein's Brahms. The pianist has placed such a vivid stamp on the material that it is no longer the composer's alone… It's literally breathtaking.”

== Books and films ==
In 2001 a book, entitled "Conversations with Martins", was published about his life and career. It was written by noted pianist and Juilliard School professor David Dubal, to coincide with João's new recordings of Mozart, Haydn and Beethoven.

In 2004 a German documentary was released, Die Martins-Passion (96 min), which won several international awards. The film accompanies Martins during his darkest hours, tracing the early triumphs and dramatic events of his life. It portrays film sequences from his childhood and early years, as well as some of his most impressive performances. In the movie, Martins encounters some of his friends including the soccer player Pelé and the legendary jazz pianist Dave Brubeck.

A biographical drama film, "João, O Maestro" (João, The Conductor), was directed by Bruno Barreto and stars Alexandre Nero and Rodrigo Pandolfo as Martins at adult and young age respectively, and Alinne Moraes as Carmen, his current wife. The movie was launched worldwide in August, 2017.

== Awards and outreach ==
Martins is known for initiating social programs for underprivileged youth in Brazil, through his foundation the "Fundação Bachiana Filarmônica", which supports two orchestras that he has founded, the Bachiana Philharmonic Orchestra and the Youth Bachiana Orchestra.
