= Roman Catholic Diocese of Nakuru =

Roman Catholic diocese in Kenya

Diocese of Nakuru Dioecesis Nakurensis

Location
- Country: Kenya
- Metropolitan: Nairobi

Statistics
- Area: 18,149 km^{2} (7,007 sq mi)
- Population: Total; Catholics: (as of 2026); 3,202,579; 677,202 (21.1%)

Information
- Rite: Latin Rite
- Cathedral: Christ the King Cathedral

Current leadership
- Pope: Leo XIV
- Bishop: Cleophas Oseso Tuka

The Roman Catholic Diocese of Nakuru (Latin: Dioecesis Nakurensis) is a diocese of the Latin Church located in the city of Nakuru in Kenya. It forms part of the ecclesiastical province of the Archdiocese of Nairobi, to which it is a suffragan see. The diocese covers the administrative counties of Nakuru and Baringo, encompassing an area of 18,149 km². As of 2026, it comprises 62 parishes and 3 missions, served by 180 priests (122 diocesan and 58 religious), 395 members of religious orders, and 23 seminarians. The diocesan seat is Christ the King Cathedral in Nakuru city, and the diocese is home to the National Shrine of Our Lady of Africa at Subukia.

== History ==
=== Early evangelization (1904–1927) ===
The Catholic Diocese of Nakuru was once part of the ecclesiastical territory of the Vicariate of the Upper Nile. The Mill Hill Missionaries arrived in western Kenya in 1904, where the Church grew rapidly among the Luo, Luhya, and Kisii communities. The area now covered by the diocese was at that time occupied by white settlers, migrant labourers, and Kalenjin peoples in the Kipsigis and Tugen reserves.

In 1905, Fr. Luke Plunkett of the Mill Hill Missionaries (MHM) opened the first Catholic mission in the region at Naivasha. Evangelization in Nakuru town dates to 1907, when Fr. Thomas Mathews (MHM) obtained a plot for a church at what is now the Nakuru showground. Before this plot was developed, Fr. Plunkett celebrated Mass once a month in the waiting room of Nakuru railway station. In 1927, a new plot along what is now Moi Road was allocated to the missionaries in exchange for the showground site. When Monsignor Brandsma became the new Vicar Apostolic of Kisumu, he relocated the Nakuru chapel to this location, and the Nakuru mission was formally opened in 1928 when Fr. Thomas Turnbull (MHM) came to reside there. During the initial stages, the missions in Naivasha and Nakuru catered primarily to European and Goan Catholics employed by the colonial government.

=== Establishment of the diocese (1968) ===
On 11 January 1968, the Diocese of Nakuru was formally erected from territory belonging to the Metropolitan Archdiocese of Nairobi, the Diocese of Eldoret, and the Diocese of Kisumu, becoming a suffragan of the Archdiocese of Nairobi. On the same date, Monsignor Denis Newman of Saint Patrick's Society for the Foreign Missions (SPS) was appointed Apostolic Administrator of the new diocese; simultaneously, Monsignor John Mahon (SPS) was appointed Prefect Apostolic of the new Lodwar Prefecture Apostolic to the north — sharing an erection date with Nakuru.

In June 1972, the diocese gained additional territory from the Diocese of Eldoret. Until January 1996, the diocese also encompassed what are now Kericho and Bomet counties. On 6 December 1995, territory was detached to create the Diocese of Kericho.

=== National shrine ===
The Subukia National Shrine], formally known as the Village of Mary, Mother of God, is located within the diocese at Subukia along the Nakuru–Nyahururu highway, approximately 40 km from Nakuru city. The shrine is owned by the Kenya Conference of Catholic Bishops (KCCB) and entrusted to the Conventual Franciscan Friars.

In 1980, during preparation for Pope John Paul II's first pastoral visit to Kenya, the KCCB discussed establishing a national Marian shrine. The Pope welcomed the idea and blessed its foundation stone on 7 May 1980. In 1985, Fr. John Jones of St. Patrick's Missionary Society established a small shrine at an outstation called Munanda, seven kilometres from the Subukia parish centre. The original 12-acre site proved too small; the shrine was relocated to its present 200-acre valley site, with Conventual Franciscan Friars taking over administration in 2006.

Every year, as many as 200,000 people visit the shrine for Marian devotions, Mass, and reconciliation services, including approximately 50,000 for Kenya's annual national day of prayer in early October. The shrine has attracted pilgrims from Kenya, Uganda, Tanzania, South Sudan, Malawi, and Zambia, and is embraced by people of multiple faiths, earning a reputation as a national interfaith spiritual centre. Many pilgrims believe the natural spring at the shrine has healing properties, drawing comparisons to the Shrine of Our Lady of Lourdes in France. The local church has not formally investigated these claims and has issued no ruling on the purported supernatural properties of the spring water.

In 2025, Bishop Cleophas Oseso Tuka called on Kenyans of all faiths to help rehabilitate the shrine to international standards, and a national fundraising committee chaired by Justice Alfred Mabeya was formed with the support of the KCCB.

== Bishops ==
=== Apostolic Administrator ===
- Fr. Denis Newman, S.P.S. — Apostolic Administrator, 1968 – 30 August 1971

=== Ordinary Bishops ===
==== Raphael S. Ndingi Mwana a'Nzeki (1971–1996) ====
Raphael S. Ndingi Mwana a'Nzeki (25 December 1931 – 30 March 2020) was born in Myanyani village, Mwala location, Machakos County. Ordained a priest on 1 January 1961 by Archbishop J. J. McCarthy, C.S.Sp., he was the first Kamba man to be ordained a Roman Catholic priest. He was appointed first Bishop of the Diocese of Machakos on 31 May 1969 and consecrated by Pope Paul VI in Kampala on 1 August 1969.

On 30 August 1971, he was appointed the first residential Bishop of Nakuru, where he served for 25 years. During the 1992 Rift Valley ethnic clashes, he sheltered displaced families at Christ the King Cathedral in Nakuru and publicly condemned the provincial administration's complicity in violence that reportedly claimed approximately 2,000 lives. He was also instrumental in championing the idea of the Subukia National Shrine. On 14 June 1996, he was appointed Coadjutor Archbishop of Nairobi, and on 21 April 1997 he succeeded Cardinal Maurice Michael Otunga as Archbishop of Nairobi. He retired in 2007 and died on 30 March 2020.

Between 1996 and 1997, Very Rev. Moses Muraya Muchunu served as Diocesan Administrator during the interregnum.

==== Peter Joseph Kairo (1997–2008) ====
Peter Joseph Kairo (born 24 May 1941) was born at Londoners, Nakuru, in Nakuru County. He was the first priest ordained for the Diocese of Nakuru — ordained on 8 November 1970 by Bishop Ndingi — and later the first priest of the diocese elevated to the episcopate. Pope John Paul II appointed him the first Bishop of the newly erected Diocese of Murang'a on 17 March 1983, where he served until 1997.

On 21 April 1997, Pope John Paul II appointed him Bishop of Nakuru — his home diocese — a challenge he acknowledged with the words "a prophet is not accepted in his hometown." During his tenure the diocese experienced the aftermath of the 1997–98 Rift Valley violence and the murder of Fr. John Anthony Kaiser in August 2000, as well as violence during the 2007–08 post-election crisis. Pope Benedict XVI appointed him Archbishop of Nyeri on 19 April 2008; he retired in April 2017 and holds the title Archbishop Emeritus of Nyeri.

==== Maurice Muhatia Makumba (2009–2022) ====
Maurice Muhatia Makumba (born 19 May 1968) was born in Lirhanda Village, Kakamega County. He holds a Bachelor's degree from the Pontifical Urban University in Rome, a Master's degree from the Pontifical University of the Holy Cross, and a Doctorate in Philosophy from the same institution. He was ordained a priest for the Diocese of Kakamega on 15 October 1994. Appointed Bishop of Nakuru on 19 December 2009 and consecrated on 27 February 2010, he was at that time the youngest Catholic bishop in Kenya at age 41. During his tenure he served as Vice Chairman of the KCCB and Principal Administrator of the Kenya Catholic Secretariat. On 18 February 2022, Pope Francis appointed him Archbishop of Kisumu.

==== David Kamau Ng'ang'a (Apostolic Administrator, 2022–2023) ====
Following Archbishop Makumba's elevation, Pope Francis in March 2022 appointed Rt. Rev. David Kamau Ng'ang'a, Auxiliary Bishop of the Nairobi Archdiocese, as Apostolic Administrator of the Diocese of Nakuru. He served in this role until Bishop Oseso Tuka's installation in May 2023.

==== Cleophas Oseso Tuka (2023–present) ====
Cleophas Oseso Tuka (born 26 November 1967) was born in Naivasha, Nakuru County. He studied philosophy at Saint Augustine's Senior Seminary in Mabanga and theology at Saint Matthias Mulumba Senior Seminary in Tindinyo, and was ordained a priest for the Diocese of Nakuru on 24 June 1995. He subsequently earned a Master of Business Administration from Le Moyne College and a Doctorate in Education from the Graduate Theological Foundation, both in the United States.

He held various roles including parish vicar of Njoro (1995–1996), diocesan bursar (1999–2003), parochial vicar in the Archdiocese of New York (2004–2013), parish priest in Kabarnet (2013–2018), and Vicar General and parish priest of Saint Augustine in Bahati (2018–2023). On 15 February 2023, Pope Francis appointed him Bishop of Nakuru, with the announcement published simultaneously in L'Osservatore Romano. He was consecrated and installed as the fourth Bishop of Nakuru on 6 May 2023, with Archbishop Hubertus van Megen, Apostolic Nuncio to Kenya and South Sudan, as principal consecrator. His episcopal motto is Per Caritatem servite Invicem ("Through love, serve one another"), drawn from Galatians 5:13.

== Other priests of this diocese who became bishops ==
- Dominic Kimengich, appointed auxiliary bishop of Lodwar in 2010
- Alfred Kipkoech Arap Rotich, appointed auxiliary bishop of Nairobi in 1996

== Seminaries ==
The Diocese of Nakuru supports St. Mary's Propaedeutic Seminary in Molo and is associated with St. Augustine's Senior Seminary in Mabanga.

== See also ==
- List of Catholic dioceses in Kenya
- Roman Catholic Archdiocese of Nairobi
- Subukia National Shrine
- Roman Catholic Diocese of Kericho
