= Henry Juma Odonya =

Kenyan Catholic prelate (born 1976)

The Most Reverend Henry Juma Odonya
- Bishop of Kitale
- Church: Catholic Church
- Archdiocese: Roman Catholic Archdiocese of Kisumu
- See: Diocese of Kitale
- Appointed: 04 November 2022
- Installed: 21 January 2023
- Predecessor: Maurice Anthony Crowley
- Successor: Incumbent

Orders
- Ordination: 25 February 2006 by Cornelius Korir
- Consecration: 21 January 2023 by Hubertus van Megen
- Rank: Bishop

Personal details
- Born: 10 December 1976 (age 49) Nairobi, Kenya

Styles of Henry Juma Odonya
- Reference style: Your Lordship; The Most Reverend
- Spoken style: His Lordship
- Religious style: Bishop

Henry Juma Odonya (born 10 December 1976) is a Kenyan Catholic prelate who serves as the Bishop of the Roman Catholic Diocese of Kitale since November 2022. Appointed bishop on 4 November 2022 by Pope Francis, he succeeded Bishop Maurice Anthony Crowley. Before he was appointed bishop, he served as a priest of the Catholic Diocese of Eldoret from 25 February 2006 until 4 November 2022. He was consecrated at Kitale on 21 January 2023 by the hands of Hubertus Matheus Maria van Megen, Titular Archbishop of Novaliciana and Papal Nuncio.

== Background and education ==
Odonya was born on 10 December 1976 in Nairobi, Kenya. He studied at Saint Mary's Major Seminary in Molo for his spiritual year in 1997. He then studied philosophy at Saint Augustine Major Seminary in Mabanga, Bungoma County, Kenya from 1998 to 1999 before he transferred to Saint Thomas Aquinas Major Seminary in Nairobi, where he studied theology from 2000 to 2004. In 2008 he graduated with a Licentiate in Missiology from the Pontifical Urban University in Rome, Italy.

== Priesthood ==
While still a seminarian, Odoanya became an associate of the St. Patrick's Missionary Society (SPS). He was ordained deacon on 11 June 2005. On 25 February 2006, he was ordained a priest of the Roman Catholic Diocese of Eldoret by Bishop Cornelius Korir.

As priest he served as assistant parish priest of St. Patrick's Kapcherop Parish from 2006 to 2007, St. Teresa of Avila Ndalat Parish (2008–2009); Parish priest of St. Patrick's Kapcherop Parish (2009–2011), St. Zeno Kolongolo Parish, Kitale (2011–2013), Holy Family Parish, Chepchoina (2013–2015) and St. Teresa of Avila Ndalat Parish, Eldoret (2015–2016); parish vicar of Huruma Parish, Eldoret (2019–2020); formator at St. Patrick's Philosophy House, Durban, South Africa (2020–2022).

== Episcopacy ==
On 4 November 2022, Pope Francis appointed Odonya as Bishop of the Diocese of Kitale. He was consecrated and installed on 21 January 2023 by Archbishop Hubertus van Megen and Co-consecrators: Bishop Maurice Anthony Crowley and Bishop Dominic Kimengich. He succeeded Maurice Anthony Crowley.

== See also ==
- Catholic Church in Kenya

Catholic Church titles
| Preceded by Maurice Anthony Crowley (3 April 1998 - 4 November 2022) | Bishop of Kitale (since 4 November 2022) | Succeeded by Incumbent |
