= St. Matthias Mulumba Tindinyo Seminary =

St. Matthias Mulumba Senior Seminary is Kenya's National Theologicum Seminary for training of Catholic clergy. It is the youngest of four National Catholic Seminaries in Kenya and is owned and run by the Kenya Conference of Catholic Bishops (K.C.C.B.) and the Holy See. As of 2014 it was the biggest theologicum in Kenya, with over 100 students and a capacity for double that number.

It celebrated its silver jubilee on 14 February 2014.

== History ==
The seminary's history can be dated from around 1962, when Mill Hill priest Fr. Kuhn was asked by the bishop of Kisumu to start a parish in Tindinyo. Fr. Kuhn invited the Xaverian Brothers from Mumias to establish their house and serve Tindinyo parish. These brothers built a school, Our Lady of Perpetual Help Secondary School, for form I and II for their aspirants.

By around 1968-69 there were hardly any aspirants joining the school, and it was converted into a high school for forms V and VI of St. Peters Minor Seminary. During that time it was unofficially referred to as "Tindinyo College". Among the prominent students of the then Tindinyo college are Bishop John Oballa Owaa, the ordinary of the Roman Catholic Diocese of Ngong and the Late Bishop Linus Okok Okwach, Bishop Norman King'oo Wambua of Machakos Diocese and Bishop Mark Kadima Wamukoya ordinary of the Roman Catholic Diocese of Bungoma. This college was phased out with the introduction of Kenya's 8-4-4 system of education.

Meanwhile, the Catholic bishops of Kenya were contemplating beginning a second Theologicum to serve as home for African Christian Theology and inculturation, and Tindinyo provided a fertile ground for such an enterprise. On 27 January 1989 the new theologicum opened its doors to 79 students, a resident staff of three priests (the founding rector was Fr. Sylvester Sulwe) and served by the Assumption Sisters of Eldoret. It was named after the oldest Uganda Martyr, St. Matthias Mulumba Kalemba. On 22 February 1989 the seminary was officially inaugurated by the Apostolic Nuncio to Kenya Archbishop Clemente Faccani accompanied by all the bishops of Kenya, including Cardinal Maurice Michael Otunga. Later the Seminary was affiliated to the Pontifical Urban University in Rome and was hence able to offer the baccalaureate degree in sacred Theology in addition to its internal diploma in theology. As from 2023, it is officially affiliated to the Catholic University of Eastern Africa (CUEA).

Bishop Michael Cornelius Otieno Odiwa of the Diocese of Homa Bay was a student in the pioneer class of St. Matthias Mulumba Senior Seminary, Tindinyo.

Tindinyo Seminary was temporarily closed on 16 February 2005. It was reopened on 5 August 2005 with 79 theology I students and three resident staff with the Assumption Sisters of Eldoret as supporting staff. The staff comprised Fr. Maurice Muhatia Makumba (later Bishop of Nakuru), Fr. Michael Kamau Ithondeka (Vice Rector and dean of students) and Fr. Edward Kipyegon (spiritual Director and dean of Studies). The seminary was officially inaugurated on August 7, 2005, by Nicodemus Kirima of the Archdiocese of Nyeri. Later on 4 November 2006, the apostolic nuncio to Kenya Alain Paul Lebeaupin made an apostolic visit.

The Seminary's first Rector was Fr. Sylvester Sulwe. Others include Fathers Benjamin Kiriswa, Patrick Maliti, John Philiph Odero, Boniface Kariuki, Maurice Muhatia Makumba (later Bishop of Nakuru), Dominic Kimengich (later Bishop of Lodwar), Daniel Nakameti, and, as of 2014, Douglas Mwinja.

== Former students ==
Among prominent former students are:

- Bishop Michael Cornelius Otieno Odiwa of Homa Bay Diocese
- Bishop Cleophas Oseso of Nakuru Diocese
- Bishop Simon Peter Kamomoe, Auxiliary Bishop of Nairobi.
- Bishop Wallace Ng'ang'a Gachihi, Bishop of the Military Ordinariate of Kenya
- Bishop- elect Mons. John Mbua Mwandi, Bishop-elect Catholic Diocese of Kitui.
- Fr. Ferdinand Lugonzo, the immediate former secretary general of A.M.E.C.E.A. and, from January 2021 to January 2024, the General Secretary of the Kenya Conference of Catholic Bishops (KCCB)
- Fr. Micheal Kamau Ithondeka
- Fr. Paul Miyam,
- Fr. Callistus Nyangilo, working at the Dicastery for the Clergy, Vatican.
- Fr. Peter Nicholas Makokha, served SMMSS as formatter and lecturer in canon law
- Fr. Vincent Mulwa, parish priest of Our Lady of Victory Cathedral, Machakos Diocese
- Fr. Leonard Ekisa
- Fr. Silas Ndwiga, lecturer of Canon Law at the same seminary,
- Fr. Dunstan Epalaat, a pastoral theologian who was also a formatter in the same seminary
- Fr. Eliud Thomas Wanyoinke, Vicar General of Embu diocese
- Fr. Augustine Chumo from the Diocese of Rochester in New York
- Fr. Lazarus Nzai Chogo of Mombasa Archdiocese
- Fr. Casmir Odundo of Nakuru Diocese (summa cum laude). From The Pontifical Urban University, Class of 2016.
- Fr. Benedict Nzinga of Machakos Diocese (summa cum laude) Pontifical Urban University, Class of 2018.
- Fr. Oguda Edwine Amollo of the Archdiocese of Kisumu (Summa cum Laude) Pontifical Urban University, Class of 2022.

== Professors ==
Among the professors who have taught in the Seminary are:

- Archbishop Maurice Muhatia Makumba of the Archdiocese of Kisumu
- Bishop Dominic Kimengich of Eldoret
- Archbishop Philip Arnold Subira Anyolo, Archbishop of Nairobi
- Bishop Linus Okok Okwach, Bishop Emeritus of Homa Bay
- Bishop Willybard Kitogho Lagho of Malindi
- Bishop John Kiplimo Lelei formerly Auxiliary Bishop of Eldoret., now Bishop of Kapsabet.
- Fr Thomas Richard Heath OP
- Very Rev. Fr. Daniel Rono, Former General Secretary, K.C.C.B
- Terry Henley, a pastoral theologian from Kitale
- Historian John Baur
- Fr. Anslem Kamuyu, (sacred scripture)
- Fr. John Njue, (Systematic Theology).
- Fr. Benedict Muchenditsi (Sacred Scripture)
- Fr. Charles Simbe (Church history)
- Fr. Maurice Kigame
- Fr. Josephat Ndunda (Spirituality)
- Fr. Pius Obuya (Systematic Theology)
- Fr. John Kamau (Moral Theology)
- Fr. Dr. Emmanuel Owuor (Systematic Theology)
- Fr. Erick Mwangi Gichomo
- Fr. Peter Nicholas Makokha (Canon Law)
- Fr. Benjamin Njuguna
- Fr. Charles Kiruy (Sacred Scripture)
- Fr. Francis Kimanthi (Sacred Scripture)
- Fr. John Ndirangu (General Spiritual Director)
- Fr. Stephen Lumala OP
- Prof. Peter Gichure

== Seminary Mayors ==
Many higher institutes of learning such as colleges, universities and major seminaries have an overall student leader who is normally referred to as the chairperson of the students association or as the Student Dean or simply as the head Student. However, in Tindinyo the case is different the student leader is called the MAYOR of Tindinyo and he governs with his council made up of a deputy MAYOR among other leaders. However, the term MAYOR was only incorporated in Tindinyo around 1999 when the student's council felt the need to come up with a new title that would befit the student's body made up of mature and responsible students. The following are the MAYORs (student leaders) who have served who have the seminary since inception, many of whom are now priests and deacons; some are deceased:

- 1) Mulumba Matthias (1989)
- 2) Michael Kamau Ithondeka (1989)
- 3) Muraga Henry
- 4) Amisi Protus (1991)
- 5) Francis Murira(1992)
- 6) Nobert Chumu (1993)
- 7) Martin Wanyama (1993)
- 8) Charles M. Kanai(1994)
- 9) Matheka Peter (1994)
- 10) Munyaka George (1995)
- 11) Etyang John Bosco (1995)
- 12) Mwangi Josephat (1996)
- 13) Michael Mwambegu (1997)
- 14) Kiplagat Pius(1997)
- 15) Eliud Wanyoinke (1998)
- 16) Waweru Benson (1998)
- 17) Francis Mukindi (1999)
- 18) Silas Ndwiga (2000)
- 19) Muchiri Joseph (2000)
- 20) Wambua Nicholas (2005)
- 21) Joseph Likuli Miruka (2006)
- 22) Okinyo Gabriel Atieno (2007)
- 23) Moseti Cydas (2007)
- 24) Mutia Daniel Muriungi (2008)
- 25) Nyangau Darius (2008)
- 26) Chege Joseph (2009–2010)
- 27) Silas Mawira(2009–2010)
- 28) Nobert Migoye(2010–2011)
- 29) Godias Kipkoech (2011–2012)
- 30) Vincent Alumasa (2013)
- 31) Amos Baraza(2013)
- 32) Elijah Namwaya (2013)
- 33) Denis Wangila (2014)
- 34) Lazarus Chogo (2015) (RIP)
- 35) Romanus Ageng'a Omuto (2015)
