= Maurice Anthony Crowley =

Irish Roman Catholic prelate (born 1946)

The Most Reverend Maurice Anthony Crowley
- Bishop Emeritus of Kitale, Kenya
- Church: Catholic Church
- Archdiocese: Roman Catholic Archdiocese of Kisumu
- See: Kitale
- Appointed: 3 April 1998
- Installed: 15 August 1998
- Term ended: 4 November 2022
- Predecessor: None (Diocese created)
- Successor: Henry Juma Odonya
- Other post: Apostolic Administrator of the Roman Catholic Diocese of Eldoret (22 November 2017 until 1 February 2020)

Orders
- Ordination: 4 June 1972 by James Moynagh
- Consecration: 15 August 1998 by Jozef Cardinal Tomko
- Rank: Bishop

Personal details
- Born: Maurice Anthony Crowley; 11 May 1946 (age 79) Berrings, County Cork, Ireland

Styles of Maurice Anthony Crowley
- Reference style: Your Lordship; The Most Reverend
- Spoken style: His Lordship
- Religious style: Bishop

Maurice Anthony Crowley S.P.S. (born 11 May 1946), is an Irish-born prelate who served as Bishop of the Roman Catholic Diocese of Kitale, Kenya from 1998 until his age-related retirement in 2022. He concurrently served as Apostolic Administrator of the Roman Catholic Diocese of Eldoret, Kenya from 2017 until 2020. He is a member of the Saint Patrick's Missionary Society. He was appointed bishop on 3 April 1998 by Pope John Paul II.

== Early life and education ==
He was born on 11 May 1946 in Berrings, in the Diocese of Clovne, County Cork, Ireland. He studied Philosophy and Theology before he was ordained a member of the Kiltegan Fathers and a priest in June 1972. In 1968, he graduated with a Bachelor of Science degree from the University College Cork, prior to his priestly ordination..

== Priest ==
On 4 June 1972 he was ordained a priest of the St. Patrick's Missionary Society at Killamoate, Wicklow, Leinster, Ireland by the hands of Bishop James Moynagh, S.P.S., Bishop Emeritus of Calabar. He served in that capacity until 3 April 1998. Father Crowley taught physics at Saint Patrick's High School. He concurrently served as parish priest and school chaplain. This was during the 1980's.

== Bishop ==
On 3 April 1998 Pope John Paul II appointed him Bishop of the newly-created Diocese of Kitale. He was consecrated and installed at Kitale on 15 August 1998 by the hands of Jozef Cardinal Tomko, Cardinal-Priest of Santa Sabina assisted by Bishop Cornelius Kipng’eno Arap Korir, Bishop of Eldoret and Bishop Philip Arnold Subira Anyolo, Bishop of Kericho.

On 22 November 2017, following the death of Bishop Cornelius Kipng'eno Arap Korir of the adjacent diocese of Eldoret, The Holy Father appointed Bishop Maurice Anthony Crowley as the Apostolic Administrator of Eldoret, Kenya. That administratorship ceased on 1 February 2020 when a new bishop was installed at Eldoret that day.

Bishop Crowley is a member of the governing council of the Catholic University of Eastern Africa (CUEA). In 2020 Bishop Crowley was appointed to the first governing Council of Tangaza University in Nairobi, following it being granted University status.

On 4 November 2022 the retirement request submitted by Bishop Maurice Anthony Crowley, Ordinary of the diocese of Kitale was approved by The Holy Father. Pope Francis appointed Bishop Henry Juma Odonya, S.P.S., as the successor. He was installed on 21 January 2023. Bishop Crowley lives on as Bishop Emeritus of Kitale, Kenya.

== See also ==
- Catholic Church in Kenya

== Succession table ==
Catholic Church titles
Preceded by None (Diocese created) (Before 3 April 1998)	Bishop of Kitale (since3 April 1998 - 4 November 2022)	Succeeded by Henry Juma Odonya
