= John Kiplimo Lelei =

Kenyan Roman Catholic prelate (born 1958)

The Most Reverend John Kiplimo Lelei
- Bishop of Kapsabet, Kenya
- Church: Catholic Church
- Archdiocese: Roman Catholic Archdiocese of Kisumu
- See: Roman Catholic Diocese of Kapsabet
- Appointed: 10 July 2025
- Installed: 30 August 2025
- Predecessor: None (Diocese created)
- Successor: Incumbent
- Previous post(s): Auxiliary Bishop of Eldoret (27 March 2024 - 10 July 2025)

Orders
- Ordination: 26 October 1985
- Consecration: 25 May 2024 by Hubertus Matheus Maria van Megen

Personal details
- Born: John Kiplimo Lelei; 15 August 1958 (age 67); Soy, Prefecture Apostolic of Eldoret, Uasin Gishu County, Kenya

John Kiplimo Lelei (born 15 August 1958) is a Kenyan prelate of the Catholic Church who is the Bishop of the Roman Catholic Diocese of Kapsabet since 10 July 2025. Before then, since 27 March 2024, he was Auxiliary Bishop of the Diocese of Eldoret. He concurrently served as Titular Bishop of Mons in Numidia, while auxiliary bishop. He was appointed bishop by Pope Francis on 27 March 2024. He was consecrated at the Mother of Apostles Seminary in Eldoret on 25 May 2024. On 10 July 2025, The Holy Father, Pope Leo XIV transferred him to the Diocese of Kapsabet, a new diocese that he created that same day, and made him the local ordinary there. His installation at Kapsabet diocese followed on 30 August 2025 at the Eliud Kipchoge Sports Complex.

== Early life and education ==
He was born on 15 August 1958 in Soy, Apostolic Prefecture of Eldoret, Uasin Gishu County, in western Kenya. He studied philosophy at Saint Augustine's Senior Seminary in Mabanga, Bungoma County. He then transferred to Saint Thomas Aquinas Major Seminary in Nairobi, where he studied theology. He holds a Doctorate in theology, with specialization in liturgy awarded by the University of Vienna (German:Universität Wien).

== Priest ==
John Kiplimo Lelei was ordained a priest on 26 October 1985 for the diocese of Eldoret. He served as a priest until 27 March 2024.

As a priest, he held several positions in various locations including:

- Parish vicar in Suwerwa and Chepterit from 1985 until 1987.
- Parish priest in Yamumbi, Suwerwa, Chepterit and Tachasis from 1987 until 1996.
- Vicar forane of the deaneries of Kitale and Nandi from 1987 until 1996.
- Parish collaborator at St. Brigitta and Zum Gottlichen Erloser, in the Roman Catholic Archdiocese of Vienna from 1996 until 2002.
- Parish priest of St. Patrick in Kapcherop from 2002 until 2003.
- Parish priest of Saint Boniface in Tindinyo from 2003 until 2007.
- Lecturer at the AMECEA Pastoral Institute in Eldoret from 2003 until 2004.
- Lecturer at the Institute of Development Studies in Kobujoi from 2004 until 2009.
- Lecturer at the St. Matthias Mulumba Tindinyo Seminary from 2003 until 2008.
- Parish priest of Saint Peter's in Kapsabet from 2007 until 2008.
- Lecturer and formator of St. Matthias Mulumba Tindinyo Seminary from 2008 until 2017.
- Rector of St. Thomas Aquinas Major Seminary in Nairobi from 2017 until 2023.
- Vicar general of Eldoret Diocese from 2017 until 2023.

== Bishop ==
On 27 March 2024, Pope Francis appointed hm auxiliary bishop of Eldoret, concurrently giving him the titular see of Mons in Numidia. He was consecrated bishop at Eldoret on 25 May 2024. The Principal Consecrator was Hubertus Matheus Maria van Megen, Titular Archbishop of Novaliciana assisted by Maurice Muhatia Makumba, Archbishop of Kisumu and Dominic Kimengich, Bishop of Eldoret.

On 10 July 2025, Pope Leo XIV created the Roman Catholic Diocese of Kapsabet by splitting the diocese of Eldoret. The Holy Father appointed Bishop John Kiplimo Lelei, previously auxiliary bishop of Eldoret as the pioneer bishop of the new diocese, a suffragan of the Metropolitan Ecclesiastical Province of Kisumu. His installation at Kapsabet took place on 30 August 2025.

== See also ==
- Catholic Church in Kenya

== Succession table ==
Catholic Church titles
Preceded by Diocese created (10 July 2025)	Bishop of Kapsabet (since 10 July 2025)	Succeeded by Incumbent
Unknown	Auxiliary Bishop of Eldoret (27 March 2024 - 10 July 2025)	Unknown
Titular church created	Titular Bishop of Mons in Numidia; 27 March 2024 – 10 July 2025	Succeeded by Unknown
