= Michael Cornelius Otieno Odiwa =

Kenyan Catholic prelate

The Most Reverend Michael Cornelius Otieno Odiwa
- Bishop of Homa Bay
- Church: Roman Catholic Church
- Archdiocese: Kisumu
- See: Homa Bay
- Appointed: 29 November 2020
- Installed: 9 February 2021
- Predecessor: Philip Arnold Subira Anyolo
- Successor: Incumbent

Orders
- Ordination: 3 July 1993
- Consecration: 9 February 2021 by Hubertus Matheus Maria van Megen
- Rank: Bishop

Personal details
- Born: Michael Cornelius Otieno Odiwa; 11 November 1962 (age 63) Sori Karungu Village, Diocese of Kisii, Kenya
- Motto: Tranquillitas et Sapientia

Styles of Michael Cornelius Otieno Odiwa
- Reference style
- Religious style: Bishop

Michael Cornelius Otieno Odiwa (born 11 November 1962) is a Roman Catholic prelate in Kenya, who is the Bishop of the Roman Catholic Diocese of Homa Bay. He was appointed as bishop by Pope Francis on 29 November 2020.

== Early life and education ==
He was born on 11 November 1962 in Sori Karungu Village in Migori County in the Diocese of Kisii, in Kenya. He was baptized at Migori Parish in 1963. He undertook spiritual studies at St. John's Senior Seminary at Molo, Nakuru County, from 1986 until 1987. He studied philosophy at St. Augustine's Senior Seminary at Mabanga, Bungoma, Kenya from 1987 until 1988. He then attended St. Matthias Mulumba Tindinyo Seminary at Tindinyo, Nandi, Kenya from 1989 until 1992. He graduated with a Bachelor's degree from there. He holds a Doctorate degree in Canon Law awarded by the Pontifical Urban University, in Rome Italy in 2005.

== Priesthood ==
He was ordained a deacon of Kisii Diocese in 1992. He was then ordained a Priest of the Catholic Diocese of Kiisi, Kenya on 3 July 1993. He was incardinated as a priest of Homa Bay on 18 October 1993.

As a priest, he served in many roles including the following:

- Parish priest of Nyalieng'a Parish
- Parish priest of Ang'iya Parish
- Parish priest of Rakwaro Parish
- Parish priest of Asumbi Parish
- Priest at St John’s Seminary Rakwaro
- Parish Priest of the Homa Bay Cathedral, in Homa Bay
- Vicar General of Homa Bay Diocese
- Assistant Parish Priest responsible for Italian speaking community of the Annunciation Church Hectorville Parish, in the Archdiocese of Adelaide in South Australia
- Defender of Bond Tribunal of the province of Adelaide South Australia and Northern Territories.

== As bishop ==
On 29 November 2020, Pope Francis appointed him bishop of the Roman Catholic Diocese of Homa Bay. He was consecrated as bishop on 9 February 2021 at the grounds of Homa Bay High School, in Homa Bay, Diocese of Homa Bay. The Principal Consecrator was Archbishop Hubertus Matheus Maria van Megen, Titular Archbishop of Novaliciana and Papal Nuncio assisted by Archbishop Philip Arnold Subira Anyolo, Archbishop of Kisumu and Archbishop Zacchaeus Okoth, Archbishop Emeritus of Kisumu.

== See also ==
- Catholic Church in Kenya

== Succession table ==
Catholic Church titles
Preceded by Philip Arnold Subira Anyolo (2003 - 2018)	Bishop of Homa Bay; Since 9 February 2021	Succeeded by Incumbent
