= Mark Kadima Wamukoya =

Kenyan Catholic prelate

The Most Reverend Mark Kadima Wamukoya
- Bishop of Bungoma, Kenya
- Church: Catholic Church
- Archdiocese: Roman Catholic Archdiocese of Kisumu
- See: Roman Catholic Diocese of Bungoma
- Appointed: 14 December 2021
- Installed: 19 February 2022
- Predecessor: Norman King'oo Wambua
- Successor: Incumbent

Orders
- Ordination: 2 October 1993 by Philip Sulumeti
- Consecration: 19 February 2022 by Hubertus Matheus Maria van Megen

Personal details
- Born: Mark Kadima Wamukoya; 30 April 1964 (age 61) Kholera Village, Kakamega County, Kenya
- Motto: Nihil impossibile apud Deum

Mark Kadima Wamukoya (born 30 April 1964) is a Kenyan prelate of the Catholic Church who is the Bishop of the Roman Catholic Diocese of Bungoma since 19 February 2022. He was appointed bishop on 14 December 2021 by Pope Francis.

== Early life and education ==
He was born on 30 April 1964 in Kholera Village, Kakamega County, Kenya. He attended Kholera Primary School from 1972 until 1978. He joined St. Peter's Seminary Mukumu, in Kakamega and studied from there between 1979 and 1982. He then transferred to St. Matthias Mulumba Tindinyo Seminary, studying there from 1983 until 1984.

From 1985 until 1986 he studied at St. Mary’s Seminary in Molo. He continued on to St. Augustine's Senior Seminary, in Mabanga, Bungoma district where he studied philosophy, from 1986 until 1987.

In 1987 Wamukoya entered the Pontifical Urban University in Rome, where he graduated with a Bachelor's degree in Philosophy in 1988. He was then awarded another bachelor's degree in Theology in 1991, by the same university. The same institution awarded him a Licentiate of Canon Law in 1993.

== Priest ==
He was ordained deacon of Kakamega Diocese on 20 October 1991. On 2 October 1993 he was ordained priest by Bishop Philip Sulumeti, Bishop of Kakamega. He served as priest for the Diocese of Kakamega until 14 December 2021.

He served in various roles while priest, including as:

- Parish assistant at Shiseso Parish in Ikolomani, Kakamega County
- Rector of Saint Peter's Seminary Mukumu
- Diocesan coordinator of Catholic Justice and Peace Commission
- Member of College of Consultors
- Diocesan canon law advisor
- Member of Diocesan Renewal Program Implementation Team of the African Synod
- Member of the board of governors of the Canon Law Society Kenya
- Member of the Kisumu Metropolitan Ecclesiastical Tribunal
- Vatican's chargé d'affaires of the Apostolic Nunciature in South Sudan.

== Bishop ==
On 14 December 2021 Pope Francis appointed him bishop of the diocese of Bungoma, Kenya. He was consecrated bishop and installed by Archbishop Hubertus Matheus Maria van Megen, Titular Archbishop of Novaliciana assisted by Archbishop Philip Arnold Subira Anyolo, Archbishop of Nairobi and Archbishop Maurice Muhatia Makumba, Archbishop of Kisumu.

== See also ==
- Catholic Church in Kenya

== Succession table ==
Catholic Church titles
Preceded by Norman King'oo Wambua (1998 – 2018)	Bishop of Bungoma; Since 19 February 2022	Succeeded by Incumbent
