= Longinus Atundo =

Kenyan Catholic prelate (1936-1996)

The Most Reverend Longinus Atundo
- Bishop of Bungoma, Kenya (Deceased)
- Church: Catholic Church
- Archdiocese: Roman Catholic Archdiocese of Kisumu
- See: Bungoma
- Appointed: 27 April 1987
- Installed: 28 June 1987
- Predecessor: None
- Successor: Norman King'oo Wambua

Orders
- Ordination: 30 December 1964
- Consecration: 28 June 1987 by Jozef Cardinal Tomko

Personal details
- Born: Longinus Atundo; January 4, 1936; Lung'anyiro, Kakamega County, Kenya
- Died: 15 November 1996 (aged 60); Kenya

Longinus Atundo (4 January 1936 - 15 November 1996) was a Kenyan Roman Catholic prelate who served as the Bishop of the Roman Catholic Diocese of Bungoma, Kenya from 1987 until his death in 1996. He was appointed bishop on 27 April 1987 by Pope John Paul II. He died in office on 15 November 1996 at the age of 60 years.

== Early life and education ==
He was born in Lunganyiro, Kakamega County in the Diocese of Kakamega in Kenya. He attended primary and school in Kenya. After studying philosophy and Theology, he was ordained a priest in 1964.

== Priest ==
He was ordained priest on 30 December 1964. He served in that capacity until 27 April 1987.

== Bishop ==
On 27 April 1987 The Holy Father John Paul II appointed him Bishop of the Roman Catholic Diocese of Bungoma, a new diocese that was created on the same day. He was consecrated and installed at Bungoma on 28 June 1987 by the hands of Jozef Cardinal Tomko, Cardinal-Deacon of Gesù Buon Pastore alla Montagnola assisted by Cardinal Maurice Michael Otunga, Archbishop of Nairobi and Bishop Philip Sulumeti, Bishop of Kakamega.

While bishop at Bungoma, he invited three sisters of the Arundel Community from the United Kingdom, to travel to the diocese in 1991. The nuns were offered land near the village of Myanga by a local family. After further consultations, the sisters settled in Myanga and supervised the building of a Monastery there. On 19 July 2001 a newly built chapel which was consecrated there.

He died in office on 15 November 1996, at the age of 60 years, two months shy of his 61st birthday. He is buried inside the Bungoma Catholic Cathedral at Bungoma, Kenya.

== See also ==
- Catholic Church in Kenya

== Succession table ==
Catholic Church titles
Preceded by None (Diocese created) (Before 27 April 1987)	Bishop of Bungoma (27 April 1987 - 15 November 1996)	Succeeded by Norman King'oo Wambua
