= Joseph Obanyi Sagwe =

Kenyan Catholic prelate

The Most Reverend Joseph Obanyi Sagwe
- Archbishop of Eldoret
- Church: Roman Catholic Church
- Archdiocese: Archdiocese of Eldoret
- See: Eldoret
- Appointed: 14 November 2026
- Installed: 14 November 2026
- Predecessor: Dominic Kimengich
- Successor: Incumbent
- Other post: 1. Bishop of Kakamega (5 December 2014 - 14 November 2026)

Orders
- Ordination: 25 October 1996
- Consecration: 7 March 2015 by Philip Sulumeti
- Rank: Archbishop

Personal details
- Born: Joseph Obanyi Sagwe; 10 March 1967 (age 59) Kebirigo Village, Nyamira County, Kenya

Styles of Joseph Obanyi Sagwe
- Reference style
- Religious style: Archbishop

Joseph Obanyi Sagwe (born 10 March 1967) is a Roman Catholic prelate in Kenya who is the Archbishop of the Archdiocese of Eldoret. He was appointed to that position by Pope Leo XIV on 14 November 2026. He previously served as the Bishop of the Roman Catholic Diocese of Kakamega in Kenya from 5 December 2014 until 14 November 2026. Prior to that, he was a priest of the Roman Catholic Diocese of Kisii in Kenya.

== Early life and education ==
He was born in 1967 in Kebirigo Village, Nyamira County, in the Archdiocese of Kisumu. He grew up in Nyakemicha Village in Nyamira County, and was raised by staunch Catholic parents; John Sagwe Obanyi and Theresa Kwamboka, both deceased. He is the third born in a family of four siblings. He grew up in a family of modest means.

He attended Nyakemicha Primary School before transferring to Ibara Primary School, where he obtained his Primary School Leaving Certificate. He attended St. John's Minor Seminary at Rwakaro in Migori County, where he obtained his O-Level Certificate. He went on to compete his A-Level education at the Mother of Apostles Seminary at Eldoret.

He studied philosophy and religious studies at St. Augustine Major Seminary at Mabanga, in Bungoma, obtaining a Bachelor's degree from there. He graduated with another BA in theology from St. Thomas Aquinas Seminary in Nairobi. Later he obtained a Master's degree and a Doctorate, both in Canon Law, awarded by the Pontifical Lateran University in Rome, Italy.

== Priesthood ==
He was ordained a priest of the Roman Catholic Diocese of Kisii, Kenya on 25 October 1996. In 2004, upon his return to Kenya from postgraduate studies in Rome, Father Joseph Obanyi Sagwe was appointed the Vicar General of the Catholic Diocese of Kisii. He served the entire 10 years of his priesthood in that capacity until 5 December 2014.

== As bishop ==
On 5 December 2014, Pope Francis appointed him bishop of the Roman Catholic Diocese of Kakamega. He was consecrated as bishop on 7 March 2015 at Bukhungu Stadium, Kakamega, in the Diocese of Kakamega. The Principal Consecrator was Bishop Philip Sulumeti, Bishop Emeritus of Kakamega assisted by Archbishop Zacchaeus Okoth, Archbishop Emeritus of Kisumu and Bishop Joseph Mairura Okemwa, Bishop of Kisii. On 23 June 2018 Bishop Joseph Obanyi Sagwe was appointed Apostolic Administrator of the Catholic Diocese Bungoma, Kenya. That apostolic administratorship ceased on 19 February 2022.

In January 2026, Pope Leo XIV transferred Bishop Dominic Kimengich, previously the local ordinary at the Roman Catholic Diocese of Eldoret and appointed him Coadjutor Archbishop of the Archdiocese of Mombasa. In April 2026, The Holy Father appointed Bishop Obanyi Sagwe, the local ordibary at Kakamega as Apostolic Administrator at Eldoret. On 14 November 2026, the Holy Father elevated the diocese of Eldoret to the Archdiocese of Eldoret and transferred Bishop Sagwe there as the founding Archbishop of the new metropolitan ecclesiastical province.

== See also ==
- Catholic Church in Kenya

== Succession table ==
Catholic Church titles
Preceded by Position created	Archbishop of Eldoret since 14 November 2026	Succeeded by Incumbent
Preceded by Philip Sulumeti (28 February 1978 - 5 December 2014)	Bishop of Kakamega (5 December 2014 - 14 November 2026)	Succeeded by Vacant
