= John Mbinda =

Kenyan Catholic prelate

The Most Reverend John Mbinda
- Bishop of Lodwar, Kenya
- Church: Catholic Church
- Archdiocese: Roman Catholic Archdiocese of Kisumu
- See: Lodwar
- Appointed: 4 April 2022
- Installed: 4 June 2022
- Predecessor: Dominic Kimengich
- Successor: Incumbent

Orders
- Ordination: 18 May 2002
- Consecration: 4 June 2022 by Hubertus Matheus Maria van Megen
- Rank: Bishop

Personal details
- Born: John Mbinda, 5 May 1973 (age 53) Kanzalu, Diocese of Machakos, Machakos County, Kenya
- Motto: Gaudete, iterum dico: Gaudete! ("Rejoice, again I say, rejoice!")

Styles of John Mbinda
- Reference style: Your Grace; The Most Reverend
- Spoken style: His Grace
- Religious style: Bishop

John Mbinda C.S.Sp., (born 5 May 1973) is a Kenyan Catholic prelate who serves as the Bishop of the Roman Catholic Diocese of Lodwar since 2022. He was appointed bishop on 4 April 2022 by Pope Francis. He succeeded Bishop Dominic Kimengich, who was appointed Bishop of the Catholic Diocese of Eldoret, Kenya.

== Background and education ==
He was born on 5 May 1973 in Kanzalu Parish, in the Catholic Diocese of Machakos, Kenya. He attended St. Francis Misyani Primary School, graduating in 1988. He transferred to the Pope Paul VI Seminary where he matriculated in 1992.

He joined the Congregation of the Holy Spirit (C.S.Sp.) in 1993. He studied philosophy at Spiritan Missionary Seminary, in Njiro, Archdiocese of Arusha in Tanzania from 1993 until 1996. He graduated from there with a Diploma in Philosophy and Religious Studies along with a Bachelor of Arts in Philosophy.

He studied at the Holy Spirit Novitiate Seminary at Magamba, Lushoto District in the Tanga Region of Tanzania for his novitiate year between 1996 and 1997. He then entered Tangaza University College in Nairobi, Kenya where he studied Theology from 1997 until 2002. He graduated from there with a Diploma in Mission Studies, in Social Communication and in Theology Studies and a Bachelor of Arts degree in Theology and Religious Studies.

Later, he graduated with a Master of Arts degree in Development Studies from Kimmage Development Studies Centre in Dublin, Ireland, where he studied from 2008 until 2010.

== Priest ==
While still a seminarian, he took his perpetual vows as a member of the Congregation of the Holy Spirit on 12 October 2001. He was ordained a priest of the Holy Spirit Fathers on 18 May 2002. He served in that capacity until 4 April 2022.

As a priest, he worked in various roles and different locations including as:

- Assistant parish priest responsible for pastoral work in Tangulbei Catholic Mission in Nakuru Catholic Diocese from 2002 until 2004.
- Parish priest and administrator at Kositei Catholic Mission in Nakuru Diocese from 2004 until 2008.
- Parish priest and administrator at St. Austin's Parish at Msongari in the Archdiocese of Nairobi from 2010 until 2015.
- Provincial Superior (elected) of the Province of Kenya and South Sudan from January 2015 until January 2021.
- Lecturer (part-time) at Tangaza University College in Nairobi, Kenya from 2014 until 2022
- Consultor of the Local Ordinary of the Archdiocese of Nairobi from 2016 until 2022.

== As bishop ==
On 4 April 2022, Pope Francis appointed him Bishop of the Roman Catholic Diocese of Lodwar, a Suffragan of the Metropolitan Province of Kisumu. He was consecrated and installed at the Ekales Cultural Center, Tobong Lore, in the Diocese of Lodwar on 4 June 2022. The Principal Consecrator was Archbishop Hubertus Matheus Maria van Megen, Titular Archbishop of Novaliciana assisted by Archbishop Maurice Muhatia Makumba, Archbishop of Kisumu and Bishop Dominic Kimengich, Bishop of Eldoret.

== See also ==
- Catholic Church in Kenya

== Succession table ==
Catholic Church titles
| Preceded by Dominic Kimengich (5 Mar 2011 - 16 Nov 2019) | Bishop of Lodwar (since 4 April 2022) | Succeeded by Incumbent |
