= Vicent Ouma Odundo =

Kenyan Catholic prelate (born 1978)

The Most Reverend Vicent Ouma Odundo
- Auxiliary Bishop of Kisumu, Kenya
- Church: Catholic Church
- Archdiocese: Roman Catholic Archdiocese of Kisumu
- See: Kisumu
- Appointed: 14 December 2025
- Installed: 27 February 2026

Orders
- Ordination: 20 February 2008
- Consecration: 27 February 2026
- Rank: Bishop-Elect

Personal details
- Born: Vicent Ouma Odundo; 1 June 1978 (age 48) Kisumu, Archdiocese of Kisumu, Kenya

Styles of Vicent Ouma Odundo
- Reference style: Your Lordship; The Most Reverend
- Spoken style: His Lordship
- Religious style: Bishop-Elect

Vicent Ouma Odundo (born 1 June 1978) is a Kenyan Catholic prelate, who was appointed auxiliary bishop of the Roman Catholic Archdiocese of Kisumu on 14 December 2025 by Pope Leo XIV and received contemporaneous appointment as Titular Bishop of Giru Marcelli. Prior to that, from 20 February 2008 until 14 December 2025, he was a priest of the same Catholic Archdiocese. His episcopal consecration took place at Kisumu on 27 February 2026.

== Background and education ==
He was born on 1 June 1978 in Kisumu, Archdiocese of Kisumu, in western Kenya. He studied philosophy at the Saint Augustine's Major Seminary, in Mabanga, Bungoma County. He then transferred to the Saint Thomas Aquinas Major Seminary in Nairobi, where he studied theology. Later, he obtained a Licentiate in canon law from the Pontifical Urban University in Rome, Italy. His Doctorate degree in the same subject was awarded by the Pontifical Lateran University in Rome, Italy.

== Priest ==
He was ordained a priest for the Archdiocese of Kisumu on 20 February 2008. He served as a priest until 14 December 2025. While a priest, he served in various roles and locations, including:

- Parish vicar at Saint Theresa's Cathedral in Kisumu from 2008 until 2009.
- Administrator of the parish of Saint Augustine in Nyamonye from 2009 until 2012.
- Parish priest of Holy Cross Parish in Siaya from 2012 until 2013.
- Studies in Rome, leading to the award of a licentiate in canon law from the Pontifical Urban University from 2013 until 2018.
- Studies in Rome, leading to the award of a doctorate in canon law from the Pontifical Lateran University from 2013 until 2018.
- Administrator of the parish of Saint Andrew in Bondo, Kenya from 2018 until 2019.
- Promoter of justice of the Interdiocesan Tribunal of Kisumu from 2018 until 2020.
- Chancellor and judicial vicar of the Archdiocese of Kisumu from 2019 until 2023.
- Parish Priest of Saint James the Apostle in Magadi Parish, Kisumu Archdiocese.
- Vicar General of the metropolitan archdiocese of Kisumu from 2023 until 2025.

== Bishop ==
On 14 December 2025, Pope Leo XIV appointed Reverend Father Monsignor Vicent Ouma Odundo, previously Vicar General of the Archdiocese of Kisumu, as Auxiliary Bishop of the same Metropolitan Archdiocese. He was simultaneously appointed Titular Bishop of Giru Marcelli. His episcopal consecration took place on 27 February 2026 at Kisumu. He was consecrated bishop by Hubertus Matheus Maria van Megen, Titular Archbishop of Novaliciana and Papal Nuncio assisted by Joseph Obanyi Sagwe, Bishop of Kakamega and Maurice Muhatia Makumba, Archbishop of Kisumu.

== See also ==
- Catholic Church in Kenya

== Succession table ==
Catholic Church titles
| Preceded by | Auxiliary Bishop of Kisumu (since 14 December 2025) | Succeeded by |
