= Joseph Onyango Oduor =

Kenyan Catholic prelate (born 1977)

The Most Reverend Joseph Onyango Oduor
- Coadjutor Bishop-Elect of Kisii, Kenya
- Church: Catholic Church
- Archdiocese: Roman Catholic Archdiocese of Kisumu
- See: Diocese of Kisii
- Appointed: 13 November 2026
- Installed: TBA
- Successor: Coadjutor Bishop-Elect

Orders
- Ordination: 4 November 2006
- Consecration: TBA

Personal details
- Born: Joseph Onyango Oduor; 2 May 1977 (age 49) Kenya

Styles of Joseph Onyango Oduor
- Reference style: His Grace; The Most Reverend
- Spoken style: Your Grace
- Religious style: Bishop

Joseph Onyango Oduor (O.S.A), (born 2 May 1977) is a Kenyan Catholic prelate who was appointed Coadjutor Bishop of the Roman Catholic Diocese of Kisii, in Kenya on 13 November 2026. Before that, from 4 November 2006 until he was appointed bishop, he served as a priest of the Order of Saint Augustine. He was appointed bishop by Pope Leo XIV. He is scheduled to receive his episcopal consecration on a future date to be announced later.

== Background and education ==
He was born on 2 May 1977. He joined the Order of Saint Augustine in 1998 in Kenya. He studied philosophy at the Consolata Institute of Philosophy. He then studied theology at Tangaza University in Nairobi. He undertook his novitiate in Jos, Nigeria. He holds a Licentiate in philosophy awarded by the Catholic University of Eastern Africa, in Nairobi, Kenya.

== Priest ==
He took his preliminary vows as an Augustinian on 28 August 2002. He took his perpertual vows on 16 October 2005. He was ordained a priest for his religious order on 4 November 2006. He served as a priest until 13 November 2026. While a priest, he served in various roles and locations including:

- Parish vicar of the Sacred Heart Parish in Baba Dogo, Nairobi from 2006 until 2009
- Parish priest of the Sacred Heart Parish in Baba Dogo, Nairobi from 2009 until 2011
- Prior and formator at the International Formation House of the Augustinians (Theologicum) in Nairobi from 2012 until 2019
- Dean of the deanery of Kisumu from 2021 until 2024
- Advisor of the Vicariate of the Augustinians in Kenya since 2015
- Parish priest of Saint Monica in Nyamsaria, Kisumu from 2020 until 2026
- Member of the College of Consultors of the Archdiocese of Kisumu from 2024 until 2026.

== Bishop ==
On 13 November 2026, Pope Leo XIV appointed him Coadjutor Bishop of the Roman Catholic Diocese of Kiisi, Kenya. He is expected to assist and work with Bishop Joseph Mairura Okemwa, the local ordinary at Kisii and to succeed him, when that position falls vacant.

== See also ==
- Roman Catholicism in Kenya

== Succession table ==
Catholic Church titles
Preceded by	Coadjutor Bishop-Elect of Kisii (since 13 November 2026)	Succeeded by
