= Cleophas Oseso Tuka =

Kenyan Catholic prelate

The Most Reverend Cleophas Oseso Tuka
- Bishop of Nakuru, Kenya
- Church: Catholic Church
- Archdiocese: Roman Catholic Archdiocese of Nairobi
- See: Nakuru
- Appointed: 15 February 2023
- Installed: 6 May 2023
- Predecessor: Maurice Muhatia Makumba
- Successor: Incumbent

Orders
- Ordination: 18 June 1995
- Consecration: 6 May 2023 by Hubertus Matheus Maria van Megen
- Rank: Bishop

Personal details
- Born: Cleophas Oseso Tuka; 26 November 1967 (age 58) Naivasha, Nakuru County, Diocese of Nakuru, Kenya

Styles of Cleophas Oseso Tuka
- Reference style: Your Grace; The Most Reverend
- Spoken style: His Grace
- Religious style: Bishop

Cleophas Oseso Tuka (born 26 November 1967) is a Kenyan Catholic prelate who serves as the Bishop of the Roman Catholic Diocese of Nakuru. He was appointed bishop of Nakuru on 15 February 2023 by Pope Francis.

== Background and education ==
He was born on 26 November 1967, in Naivasha, Nakuru County in the Diocese of Nakuru, in Kenya. He studied Philosophy at Saint Augustine's Senior Seminary in Mabanga, in the Diocese of Bungoma. He then transferred to the St. Matthias Mulumba Tindinyo Seminary in Nandi County where he studied Theology.

He holds a degree of Master of Business Administration awarded by the Le Moyne College, in DeWitt, New York State, United States. Later, he graduated with a Doctorate in Education from the Graduate Theological Foundation, in Sarasota, Florida, United States.

== Priest ==
He was ordained a priest of the Diocese of Nakuru on 24 June 1995. He served in that capacity until 15 February 2023.

As a priest, he served in various roles inside and outside of his diocese including as:

- Parish vicar of Njoro Parish from 1995 until 1996.
- Parish vicar of the Holy Cross Parish from 1996 until 1997.
- Diocesan procurator for Nakuru Diocese in 1998.
- Diocesan bursar for Nakuru Diocese from 1999 until 2003.
- Deputy parish priest of Saint Ambrose Parish, Endicott, in 2004.
- Deputy parish priest of Holy Family Parish in Syracuse, from 2004 until 2013.
- Deputy parish priest of Saint Margaret Parish, in Syracuse, from 2004 until 2013.
- Parish priest of the Mary Mother of God Parish in Kabarnet, Diocese of Nakuru from 2013 until 2018.
- Parish priest of the Saint Augustine Parish in Bahati, Diocese of Nakuru from 2018 until 2023.
- Vicar General of the Diocese of Nakuru from 2018 until 2023.

== As bishop ==
On 15 February 2023, Pope Francis appointed him as Bishop of the Roman Catholic Diocese of Nakuru. He was consecrated and installed at Nakuru in the Diocese of Nakuru on 6 May 2023. The Principal Consecrator was Archbishop Hubertus Matheus Maria van Megen, Papal Nuncio and Titular Archbishop of Novaliciana assisted by Bishop David Kamau Ng'ang'a, Titular Bishop of Oëa and Archbishop Maurice Muhatia Makumba, Archbishop of Kisumu.

He replaced Archbishop Maurice Muhatia Makumba who served as the Ordinary at Nakuru before he was elevated to archbishop and relocated to Kisumu Archdiocese in February 2022.

== See also ==
- Catholic Church in Kenya

== Succession table ==
Catholic Church titles
Preceded by Maurice Muhatia Makumba (19 December 2009 - 18 February 2022)	Bishop of Nakuru (since 15 February 2023)	Succeeded by Incumbent
