= Roman Catholic Diocese of Kapsabet =

Roman Catholic diocese in Kenya

Diocese of Kapsabet Dioecesis Kapsabetensis

Location
- Country: Kenya
- Metropolitan: Kisumu

Statistics
- Area: 2,888 km^{2} (1,115 sq mi)
- Population: Total; Catholics: (as of 2025); 885,711; 313,655 (35.4%)

Information
- Rite: Latin Rite

Current leadership
- Pope: Leo XIV
- Bishop: John Kiplimo Lelei

The Roman Catholic Diocese of Kapsabet (Latin: Kapsabeten(sis)) is a diocese located in the city of Kapsabet in the ecclesiastical province of Kisumu in Kenya.

== History ==
- July 10, 2025: Established as Diocese of Kapsabet from the Diocese of Eldoret

== Bishops ==
=== Ordinaries ===
- Bishops of Kapsabet (Roman rite)
  - Bishop John Kiplimo Lelei (10 July 2025 – present)

== See also ==
- Roman Catholicism in Kenya

== Sources ==
- GCatholic.org
- Catholic Hierarchy
