= Diocese of Nakuru =

The Diocese of Nakuru may refer to:

- Anglican Diocese of Nakuru, in the city of Nakuru, Kenya
- Roman Catholic Diocese of Nakuru, in the city of Nakuru, Kenya
