= Roman Catholic Diocese of Kitale =

Roman Catholic diocese in Kenya

Coordinates: 1°1′N 35°0′E

Diocese of Kitale Dioecesis Kitalen(sis)

Location
- Country: Kenya
- Metropolitan: Kisumu

Statistics
- Area: 11,737 km^{2} (4,532 sq mi)
- Population: Total; Catholics: (as of 2026); 2,093,000; 315,270 (15.1%)

Information
- Rite: Latin Rite
- Cathedral: Cathedral of the Immaculate Heart, Kitale

Current leadership
- Pope: Leo XIV
- Bishop: Henry Juma Odonya

The Roman Catholic Diocese of Kitale (Latin: Dioecesis Kitalen(sis)) is a diocese of the Latin Church located in the city of Kitale in Kenya. It forms part of the ecclesiastical province of the Archdiocese of Kisumu, to which it is a suffragan see. The diocese covers Trans Nzoia County and West Pokot County in the North Rift region of Kenya, spanning approximately 11,737 km². As of 2026, it comprises 35 parishes and 9 missions, served by 93 priests (66 diocesan and 27 religious), 148 members of religious orders, and 56 seminarians. The diocesan seat is the Cathedral of the Immaculate Heart in Kitale. The diocese borders Uganda to the west, Turkana County to the north, and Elgeyo Marakwet, Baringo, and Uasin Gishu counties to the east.

== History ==
=== Early Catholic presence in the region ===
The area now covered by the Diocese of Kitale was originally administered as part of the western Kenya mission by the Mill Hill Missionaries based in Kisumu, itself part of the Vicariate of the Upper Nile headquartered in Mengo, Kampala. It was not until 1920, when Kenya became a colony, that the region ceased to be administered from Kampala. Eldoret became a resident mission in 1929 and thereafter served as a base for priests travelling into Trans Nzoia, West Pokot, Baringo, and Keiyo Marakwet to establish catechumenates and secure plots for schools and parishes. The earliest churches in the present-day diocese were opened during this period: Tartar in 1946, Kituro and Tambach in 1944, Nerkwo in 1947, and Kiminini in 1951.

In 1953, Msgr. Joseph Brendan Houlihan was appointed Prefect Apostolic of Eldoret, a jurisdiction which then covered the entire area from Naivasha to Kitale to Lodwar and parts of western Kenya. In 1959, the Prefecture of Eldoret was raised to a diocese and Houlihan was appointed and consecrated its first Bishop in 1960. In 1968, the Dioceses of Nakuru and Lodwar were hived off from Eldoret. By 1990, Eldoret Diocese still comprised the counties of Nandi, Uasin Gishu, Keiyo Marakwet, Trans Nzoia, and West Pokot.

=== Establishment (1998) ===
On 3 April 1998, the Holy See announced the creation of the Diocese of Kitale, carved from the Diocese of Eldoret and comprising Trans Nzoia and West Pokot counties. At the same time, Msgr. Maurice Anthony Crowley, who was then Vicar General of the Diocese of Eldoret, was appointed its first Bishop. He was consecrated and installed at Kitale on 15 August 1998 by Cardinal Jozef Tomko, Cardinal-Priest of Santa Sabina, assisted by Bishop Cornelius Kipng'eno Arap Korir of Eldoret and Bishop Philip Arnold Anyolo of Kericho.

At its inception, the diocese had 23 parishes with 408 outstations, one vicar general, two deans, 49 diocesan priests, 64 religious priests, 8 brothers, and 63 sisters. It immediately established eight diocesan departments: vocations, education and religious education, family life education, development and social services, Justice and Peace, water, health, and social communications.

== Peace and conflict work ==
The Diocese of Kitale has been active in peacebuilding in the conflict-affected North Rift region of Kenya, where cattle rustling and intercommunal violence between pastoralist groups have persisted for decades. In June 2023, the Diocese joined the North Rift Peace Initiative (NRPI), a project initiated by the Catholic Justice and Peace Departments of six dioceses- Eldoret, Nyahururu, Nakuru, Kitale, Maralal, and Lodwar- to address the root causes of violence and build lasting peace in the region.

In September 2023, Bishop Henry Juma Odonya joined Bishop John Mbinda of Lodwar and Bishop Cleophas Oseso Tuka of Nakuru to reconsecrate the Kapedo Catholic Church- five years after an attack there had killed two police reservists- as a symbolic act of commitment to peace.

== Education ==
Since its establishment, the diocese has invested heavily in education across Trans Nzoia and West Pokot counties, sponsoring hundreds of Catholic primary and secondary schools. Notable Catholic-sponsored institutions within the diocese include St. Joseph's Boys High School, Kitale, a national school with origins tracing to a mission-run intermediate school established around 1952 by Catholic brothers, and St. Brigid's Kiminini, a girls' institution with roots in the early mission era. Bishop Maurice Crowley oversaw a dramatic expansion of the diocese's educational footprint; by the time of his retirement, the diocese sponsored over 500 Catholic primary and secondary schools.

== Bishops ==
=== Maurice Anthony Crowley (1998–2022) ===
Maurice Anthony Crowley, S.P.S. (born 11 May 1946, Berrings, County Cork, Ireland) graduated with a Bachelor of Science from University College Cork in 1968 before studying philosophy and theology. He was ordained a priest of the St. Patrick's Missionary Society on 4 June 1972 at Killamoate, Wicklow, Ireland, by Bishop James Moynagh, SPS.

On 3 April 1998, Pope John Paul II appointed him the first Bishop of the newly created Diocese of Kitale. During his 24-year episcopate- the longest of any Kitale bishop- he also served concurrently as Apostolic Administrator of the Diocese of Eldoret from 22 November 2017, following the death of Bishop Cornelius Kipng'eno Arap Korir, until a new bishop was installed at Eldoret on 1 February 2020. He was also a member of the governing council of the Catholic University of Eastern Africa (CUEA) and was appointed to the first governing council of Tangaza University in Nairobi in 2020. On 4 November 2022, Pope Francis accepted his retirement; President William Ruto hailed Crowley as "a giant of faith."

=== Henry Juma Odonya (2022–present) ===
Henry Juma Odonya, S.P.S. (born 10 December 1976, Nairobi) was raised in Eldoret, where his parents worked for Kenya Railways. He began seminary formation at St. Mary's Major Seminary in Molo in 1997, studied philosophy at St. Augustine's Senior Seminary Mabanga from 1998 to 1999, then theology at St. Thomas Aquinas Major Seminary in Nairobi from 2000 to 2004. He was ordained a priest for the Diocese of Eldoret on 25 February 2006 by Bishop Cornelius Kipng'eno Arap Korir.

He served in various pastoral roles including parish priest at Kapcherop and Kolongolo, as a Fidei donum priest in the Diocese of Kitale (2011-2015), and as chairman of the Kenya Fidei Donum Association (2012-2015). He later pursued further studies in Rome, earning a Licentiate in Missiology from the Pontifical Urban University in 2019, and served as a formator at St. Patrick's Philosophy House in Durban, South Africa, until his appointment.

On 4 November 2022, Pope Francis appointed him Bishop of the Diocese of Kitale, with the announcement published in L'Osservatore Romano and confirmed by the Apostolic Nuncio to Kenya, Archbishop Hubertus van Megen. He was consecrated and installed at Kitale Showground on 21 January 2023, with Archbishop Hubertus van Megen as principal consecrator, assisted by Bishop Emeritus Maurice Crowley and Bishop Dominic Kimengich of Eldoret. At 46 years of age at the time of his appointment, he became the youngest Catholic bishop in Kenya.

== See also ==
- List of Catholic dioceses in Kenya
- Roman Catholic Archdiocese of Kisumu
- Roman Catholic Diocese of Eldoret
