= Diocese of Lodwar =

The Diocese of Lodwar may refer to:

- Anglican Diocese of Lodwar, in Kenya
- Roman Catholic Diocese of Lodwar, in Kenya
