= Diocese of Eldoret =

The Diocese of Eldoret may refer to:

- Anglican Diocese of Eldoret, in the city of Eldoret, Kenya
- Archdiocese of Eldoret, Roman Catholic structure in the city of Eldoret, Kenya
