= Roman Catholic Diocese of Bungoma =

Roman Catholic diocese in Kenya

Coordinates: 0.5659°N 34.5628°E

Diocese of Bungoma Dioecesis Bungomaensis

Location
- Country: Kenya
- Metropolitan: Kisumu

Statistics
- Area: 4,840 km^{2} (1,870 sq mi)
- Population: Total; Catholics: (as of 2006); 1,529,817; 543,715 (35.5%)

Information
- Rite: Latin Rite

Current leadership
- Pope: Leo XIV
- Bishop: Mark Kadima Wamukoya

The Roman Catholic Diocese of Bungoma (Latin: Bungomaën(sis)) is a diocese located in the city of Bungoma in the ecclesiastical province of Kisumu in Kenya. Deaneries and Parishes == The Catholic Diocese of Bungoma comprises 73 parishes organized across 12 deaneries:

=== Tongaren Deanery (6) ===
- Tongaren
- Naitiri
- Kibisi
- Maliki
- Ndalu
- Brigadier

=== Misikhu Deanery (7) ===
- Misikhu
- Kibuk
- Kaptalelio
- Matisi
- Kimilili
- Webuye
- Kamukuywa

=== Chebukaka Deanery (6) ===
- Chebukaka
- Mukhweya
- Sirisia
- Chwele
- Cheptais
- Bokoli

=== Kibabii Deanery (6) ===
- Kibabii
- Kanduyi
- Netima
- Nalondo
- Bukembe
- Sikusi

=== Bungoma Deanery (6) ===
- Bungoma
- Kabula
- Sang'alo
- Musikoma
- Kongoli
- Samoya

=== Kimwanga Deanery (6) ===
- Kimwanga
- Kimatuni
- Mateka
- Myanga
- Kimaeti
- Muanda

=== Kisoko Deanery (5) ===
- Kisoko
- Okatekok
- Mabunge
- Buyofu
- Madende

=== Chelelemuk Deanery (5) ===
- Chelelemuk
- Malaba
- Kocholia
- Kokare
- Machakha

=== Amukura Deanery (6) ===
- Amukura
- Akoreet
- Kwang'amor
- Ang'orom
- Kaliwa
- Chakol

=== Busia Deanery (6) ===
- Busia
- Ojamii
- Mundika
- Bugeng'i
- Lwanya
- Bulanda

=== Butula Deanery (7) ===
- Butula
- Butunyi
- Buhuyi
- Bumutiru
- Bwaliro
- Bumala A
- Bumala B

=== Nangina Deanery (8) ===
- Nangina
- Ganga
- Ganjala
- Sio Port
- Port Victoria
- Sirimba
- Magombe
- Dahiro

== History ==
- April 27, 1987: Established as Diocese of Bungoma from the Diocese of Kakamega

== Leadership ==
- Bishops of Bungoma (Roman Rite)
  - Bishop Longinus Atundo (27 Apr 1987 – 15 Nov 1996)
  - Bishop Norman King'oo Wambua (27 Jun 1998 – 23 Jun 2018), appointed Bishop of Machakos
  - Bishop Mark Kadima Wamukoya (14 Dec 2021 – present)

== See also ==
- Roman Catholicism in Kenya
- Kenya Conference of Catholic Bishops

== Sources ==
- GCatholic.org
- Catholic Hierarchy
