= Colin Cameron Davies =

Spanish prelate of the Roman Catholic Church

Colin Cameron Davies, M.H.M.
- Bishop of the Diocese of Ngong (emeritus) OBE
- Church: Roman Catholic Church
- See: Roman Catholic Diocese of Ngong
- In office: 1964–2002
- Predecessor: Joannes de Reeper
- Successor: Cornelius Schilder
- Previous post: Priest

Orders
- Ordination: 13 July 1952
- Consecration: 26 February 1977

Personal details
- Born: 10 June 1924 Las Palmas, Spain
- Died: 8 January 2017 (aged 92) Freshfield, Lancashire, England, UK

Colin Cameron Davies (10 June 1924 – 8 January 2017) was a Spanish-born prelate of the Roman Catholic Church.

Davies was born in Las Palmas, Spain, to Arthur and Ellen Mary (née Joyce) Davies, the third in the family of six children. He was ordained a priest on 13 July 1952 in the religious order of the St. Joseph's Missionary Society of Mill Hill. He was appointed prefect of Ngong, Kenya, on 9 July 1964. He was appointed bishop of Ngong on 9 December 1976 and ordained bishop on 26 February 1977. Davies retired from the diocese on 23 November 2002. He died in Freshfield, Lancashire, England on 8 January 2017, aged 92.
