= Joseph Mairura Okemwa =

Kenyan Catholic prelate

The Most Reverend Joseph Mairura Okemwa
- Bishop of Kisii, Kenya
- Church: Roman Catholic Church
- Archdiocese: Kisumu
- See: Kisii
- Appointed: 19 December 1994
- Installed: 21 July 1995
- Predecessor: Tiberius Charles Mugendi
- Successor: Incumbent

Orders
- Ordination: 27 October 1987
- Consecration: 21 July 1995 by Maurice Michael Otunga
- Rank: Bishop

Personal details
- Born: Joseph Mairura Okemwa; 29 June 1954 (age 72) Nyabururu Village, Kisii County, Diocese of Kisii, Kenya
- Motto: "Cognoscetis veritatem liberabit vos" ("You will know the truth, and the truth will set you free")

Styles of Joseph Mairura Okemwa
- Religious style: Bishop

Joseph Mairura Okemwa (born 29 June 1954), is a Roman Catholic prelate in Kenya, who is the Bishop of the Roman Catholic Diocese of Kisii. He was appointed as bishop by John Paul II on 19 December 1994.

== Early life and education ==
He was born on 29 June 1954 in Nyabururu Village in Kisii County in the Diocese of Kisii, in Kenya.

== Priesthood ==
He was ordained a priest of Kisii Diocese on 27 October, 1987. He worked in that role until 19 December, 1994.

== As bishop ==
On 19 December 1994, Pope John Paul II appointed him bishop of the Roman Catholic Diocese of Kisii. He was consecrated as bishop on 21 July, 1995. The Principal Consecrator was Cardinal Maurice Michael Otunga, Archbishop of Nairobi assisted by Archbishop Zacchaeus Okoth, Archbishop of Kisumu and Bishop John Njue, Bishop of Embu.

== See also ==
- Catholic Church in Kenya

== Succession table ==
Catholic Church titles
Preceded by Tiberius Charles Mugendi (1969 – 1993)	Bishop of Kisii; Since 21 July 1995	Succeeded by Incumbent
