= John Christopher Mahon =

John Christopher Mahon D.C.L. S.P.S.
- Bishop of Lodwar
- Church: Catholic Church
- Diocese: Diocese of Lodwar
- In office: 16 January 1968 – 17 February 2000
- Predecessor: Prefecture erected
- Successor: Patrick Harrington

Orders
- Ordination: 28 March 1948 by James Moynagh
- Consecration: 25 April 1978 by Maurice Michael Otunga

Personal details
- Born: 25 December 1922 Killurin, County Offaly, Irish Free State, Dominion of the British Empire
- Died: 10 November 2004 (aged 81) Nairobi, Kenya

Bishop John Christopher Mahon, D.C.L, S.P.S. (25 December 1922 – 10 November 2004), was an Irish born priest a member of the Kiltegan Fathers. He served as Bishop of Lodwar, Turkana, Kenya from 1978 until 2000. Mahon was born on 25 December 1922 in Killurin, Killeigh, County Offaly, Ireland. He was educated at Tullamore C.B.S., and Knockbeg College, Carlow.

He was ordained a priest in 1948. Mahon studied Canon Law in St. Patrick's College, Maynooth earning a doctorate in 1951.

He joined the teaching staff of the Saint Patrick's Society for the Foreign Missions, Kiltegan.

Dr Mahon left Kiltegan in 1959 when he was appointed to the Roman Catholic Diocese of Ogoja, Nigeria, where he was Head of St. Thomas’ Teacher Training College.

After nine years in Nigeria, Rev. Mahon moved to Kenya, after the outbreak of the Nigerian Civil War. Mahon was ordained first Bishop of Lodwar on 25 April 1978.

He died in Nairobi, Kenya suddenly on 10 November 2004, aged 82, and is buried where he served as bishop in Turkana, Kenya.
