= Patrick Harrington (bishop) =

Patrick Joseph Harrington SMA
- Bishop Emeritus of Lodwar
- Church: Catholic Church
- Diocese: Diocese of Lodwar
- In office: 17 February 2000 – 5 March 2011
- Predecessor: John Christopher Mahon
- Successor: Dominic Kimengich
- Previous post: Superior General of the Society of African Missions (1983-1995)

Orders
- Ordination: 16 December 1964
- Consecration: 20 March 2000 by Jozef Tomko

Personal details
- Born: 12 September 1939 (age 86) Kilmeage, County Kildare, Republic of Ireland

Patrick Joseph Harrington (born 12 September 1939) is the Bishop-emeritus of the Diocese of Lodwar in Kenya.

He was born in Kilmeague, County Kildare, Ireland. He was ordained a priest on 16 December 1963 for the Society of African Missions. He was General superior of the SAM between 1985 and 1993. On 17 February 2000 he was appointed Bishop of Lodwar. He was ordained a bishop on 20 March of the same year. The principal consecrator was Cardinal Jozef Tomko; his principal co-consecrators were Bishop John Christopher Mahon, S.P.S, and Archbishop Zacchaeus Okoth. He resigned as Bishop of Lodwar on 5 March 2011 and was succeeded in this office by Dominic Kimengich.
