= Milele =

Urban Gospel Group

Milele is an urban gospel and humanitarian group composed of Kanjii Mbugua, Harry Kiiru, Christian Mungai and Kaima Mwiti. The group formed after the longtime friends who were originally from Kenya met in Pomona, California at a prayer breakfast in 1998. Milele, which means "forever" in Swahili has performed alongside gospel artists like Andrae Crouch and Helen Baylor and recorded four albums, Forever, Level up, Afrique and their most recent recording, Monday. Apart from the music, Milele has also launched many campaigns in Africa with the purpose of providing means for impoverished African communities to gather strength to make steps towards better living standards.

== History ==
=== Formation and early years ===
The members of Milele were childhood friends in Kenya up until high school when they separated to follow the path of their individual lives. Each of them pursued school and work in different arenas, however, one day, 10 years later and 10,000 miles away from home in California, all four of them found themselves in the same room at a prayer breakfast. They had all come to the US separately to pursue further education. They started singing together as a pastime but it slowly not only evolved into a successful musical ensemble, but also a unity of friends committed to remedying social injustices, poverty and resulting oppression. Milele has travelled extensively and succeeded in becoming well known musical ambassadors in Kenya as well as Christian circles in the US. What began as a celebration of God through music became using music as a vehicle to carry out work that would move and spread their ministry and outreach. In the past few years, Milele averaged about 150 concerts and performances annually, mainly at churches and schools. Some of these include Lake Avenue Church, Faith Community Church, Mariners Church, Bel'Air Presbyterian Church, La Canada Presbyterian Church, Cottonwood Christian Center, First Church of the Nazarene, Pasadena, Azusa Pacific University, Claremont School of Theology, Fuller Theological Seminary, and Biola University. They have also shared the same stage with such Gospel legends as Andrae Crouch and Helen Baylor.

=== Concerts and tours ===
In 2001, Milele held a special concert in the slums and also performed to over 30,000 young people at a stadium concert. In early 2002, they had a special concert dubbed 'True Love Waits,' which was geared towards promoting abstinence in a society that is being crippled by AIDS. Kanjii of Milele was quoted saying,"We saw the success of our efforts when many young people committed their lives to waiting for the partner that God has set aside for them." In summer 2003, Milele toured forty states across the US to promote their second album. Since their successful Level Up tour, they were the featured band at the "Blessings of the Shoes" interfaith service at the Orange County AIDS Walk, which drew over 10,000 people. Shortly after, they were nominated to be one of the top ten finalists of the 95.9FM Fish Festival award. These successes culminated in their first live recording concert at Mariners Church in Irvine, California which was also their kickoff for their 2004 summer tour.

=== Members ===
Kanjii Mbugua, Harry Kiiru, Christian Mungai and Kaima Mwiti. Additional members include African Guitarist Henry "Karis" Mburu, Nimo Mathenge, and Carol Ongera.

== Charity works ==
=== Family Homes Project ===
Milele as a musical group and humanitarian organisation embarked upon the Milele Family Homes Project in light of the vast number of children who have been and continue to become deserted by the loss of their parents in Africa. The project gave them an avenue to resource all the influential people they have interacted with over the years through their music and travel. In collaboration with Infeneon Holdings, they used new technology that enabled the building of an average family home within 15 days. The panel technology involved panelling with pre-set plumbing and electricity being filled with a quick drying building material known as Moladi Chem. The panels are then removed within 10 hours to reveal the structure of a home. This enabled them to provide homes with the requirement of less time and less money.

=== Change Africa Campaign ===
Milele are better known for their humanitarian involvement rather than their music. While their music remains popular and enjoyable to many, their presence and contribution through the Change Africa Campaign and Milele Homes Project acts to propagate hope to those who are the benefactors of the efforts of the organisation. In 2000 Milele Ministries Incorporated as a non-profit organisation under the 501(c) 3 American tax code to better accomplish this purpose and launched the Change Africa campaign to drive the vision of being able to see Africans embracing the idea that the change they wish to see in their individual lives and societies can be created through empowerment, knowledge, unity and hope.

=== Crisis in Kenya ===
With the Kenya Red Cross and other volunteer organisations appealing for more aid to help displaced people in Kenya, Milele's Christian Mungai teamed up with Atlanta-based Partners for Care, Glory Outreach Assembly in Kenya where they visited 11 camps in Maai Mahiu, Naivasha and Burnt Forest PCEA Church Nakuru. "I was totally heart broken and devastated," he says. "For once I felt so bad helping as I thought to myself that we would be there for a while, give food, medical assistance etc then leave and come back to America and now I'm here in my warm bed while so many faces and names I now know are still in Maai Mahiu, Naivasha, Burnt Forest PCEA Church Nakuru and they will be there for a long time. I feel so helpless that I can't resettle these people and while many are working so hard to help others are working day and night to capitulate violence. I'm so beat and worn out, I even feel bad about taking pictures like these seems like we are there for a photo opp and thats it. My heart breaks and for once im in a state of despair at least for now. God help us and save us now". A Georgia group managed to raise US$42,000 to help the affected areas and had several volunteers who provided food and medical assistance.

== Discography ==
=== Studio albums ===
Forever

- Released: 6 June 2000
- Label: Independent

Level Up

- Released: 6 June 2003
- Label: Independent

Afrique

- Released: 6 June 2005
- Label: Independent

Monday

- Released: 6 June 2007
- Label: Independent
