= Cornelius Schilder =

Most Reverend Cornelius Schilder, M.H.M.
- Bishop emeritus of Ngong
- Church: Roman Catholic
- Province: Nairobi
- Diocese: Ngong
- See: Pro-Cathedral of St. Joseph the Worker
- Elected: 23 November 2002
- Term ended: 1 August 2009
- Predecessor: Colin Cameron Davies
- Successor: Vacant

Orders
- Ordination: 29 June 1968
- Consecration: 25 January 2003

Personal details
- Born: Cornelius Schilder; 19 September 1941 (age 85) Westwoud, Netherlands
- Residence: Oosterbeek, Netherlands
- Education: Mill Hill College, Rosendaal; Mill Hill College, London

Cornelius "Cor" Schilder, M.H.M. (born 19 September 1941) is an emeritus Roman Catholic Bishop from the Netherlands. He was the bishop of the Roman Catholic Diocese of Ngong in Kenya from 2003 to 2009.

== Biography ==
Cornelius Schilder was born on 19 September 1941 in Westwoud in the Netherlands. He studied philosophy at Mill Hill College in Roosendaal, and later theology at Mill Hill College in London, England. On 29 June 1968, he was ordained as priest in Westwoud. In 1971, he went to Kenya with the Mill Hill Missionaries and worked in the dioceses Ngong and Garissa. In 2002, he was appointed Bishop of Ngong after Colin Cameron Davies retired. On 25 January 2003 he was consecrated as bishop. In 2009, he retired "due to [a] health problem".

After contradicting allegations of sexual abuse of a boy, many years ago,

https://www.bishop-accountability.org/news2011/05_06/2011_05_27_Liguori_SexAbuse.htm

it is claimed that the Vatican induced the bishop when in his late sixties into retirement. Schilder currently does not celebrate masses in public and exercises no pastoral tasks. He lives with the Mill Hill Missionaries in Oosterbeek, Netherlands.

Catholic Church titles
Preceded by Colin Cameron Davies	Bishop of Ngong; 2002–2009	Vacant
