= John Oballa Owaa =

- Bishop of Ngong
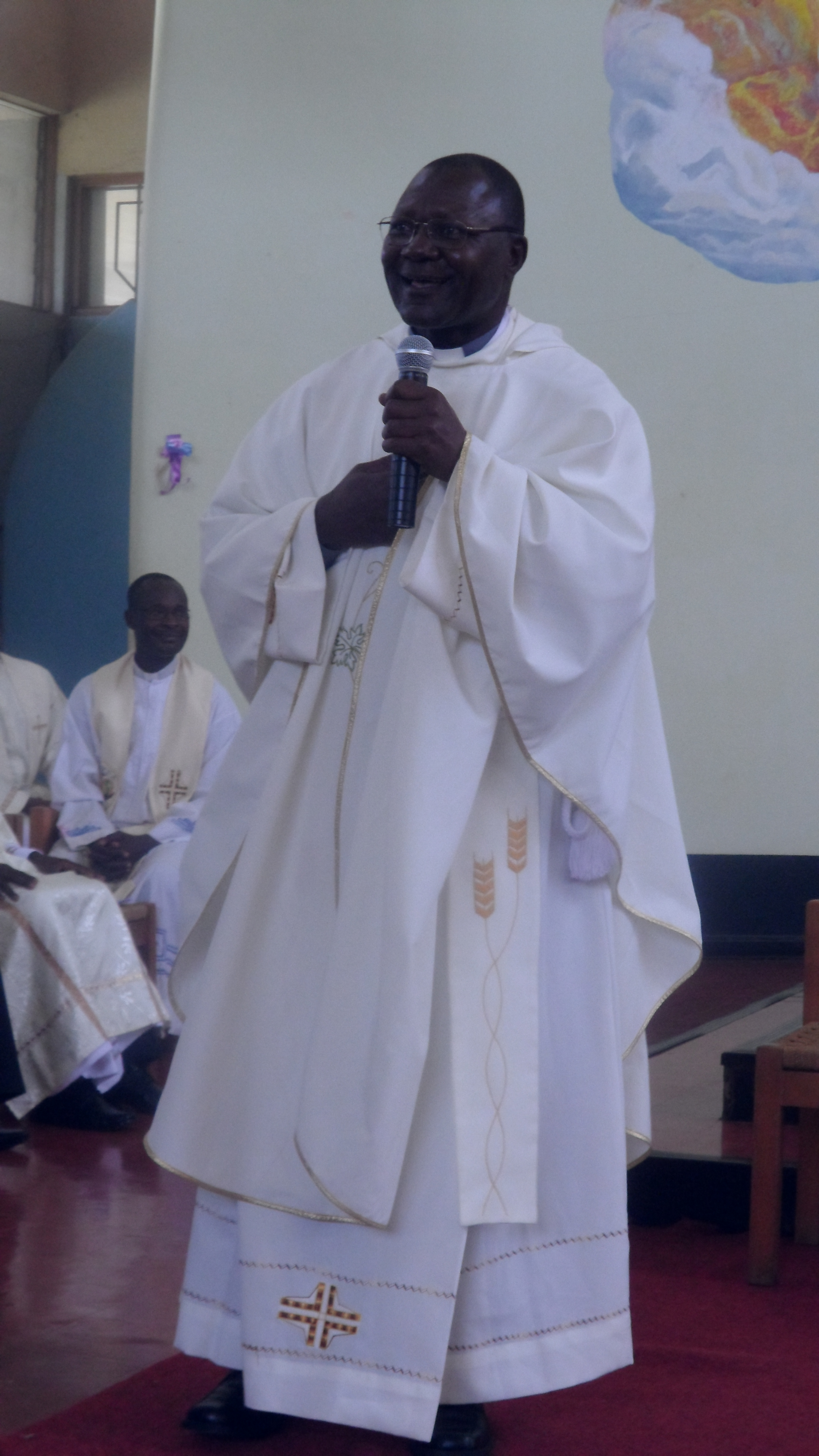
- Msgr. John Oballa Owaa addressing seminarians and their family members on 28 January 2012 at St. Thomas Aquinas Seminary, Nairobi
- Church: Catholic Church
- Diocese: Diocese of Ngong
- Appointed: 7 January 2012
- Predecessor: Cornelius Schilder

Orders
- Ordination: 28 August 1986
- Consecration: 14 April 2012 by John Njue

Personal details
- Born: 28 August 1958 (age 67) Ahero, Colony and Protectorate of Kenya, British Empire

John Oballa Owaa (born 28 August 1958, Ahero, Nyando District, Kenya) is the bishop of Ngong Diocese in Kenya - consecrated 2012 April, 14 in Ngong. His principal consecrator was John Cardinal Njue.

He was appointed the bishop of Ngong Diocese on by Pope Benedict XVI on 7 January 2012. The Diocese of Ngong remained vacant with the resignation of Bishop Cornelius Schilder, M.H.M. in August 2009.

John did his 'O' levels at St. Peter's Minor Seminary in Mukumu and then did his 'A' levels at Tindinyo College, which has since been turned to a major seminary and theological.

He attended St. Augustine Senior Seminary, Mabanga, from 1980 to 1982, and proceeded to St. Thomas Aquinas National Seminary in Nairobi. On 28 August 1986, his 28th birthday, he was incardinated and ordained a priest for Kisumu (Arch-Diocese), Kenya.

Fr. John Oballa Owaa obtained a licentiate and PhD Degrees in Canon Law at the Pontifical Urban University, Rome. While in Rome, he also worked as an official of the Pontifical Council for Health Pastoral Care between the years 1995 and 1997.

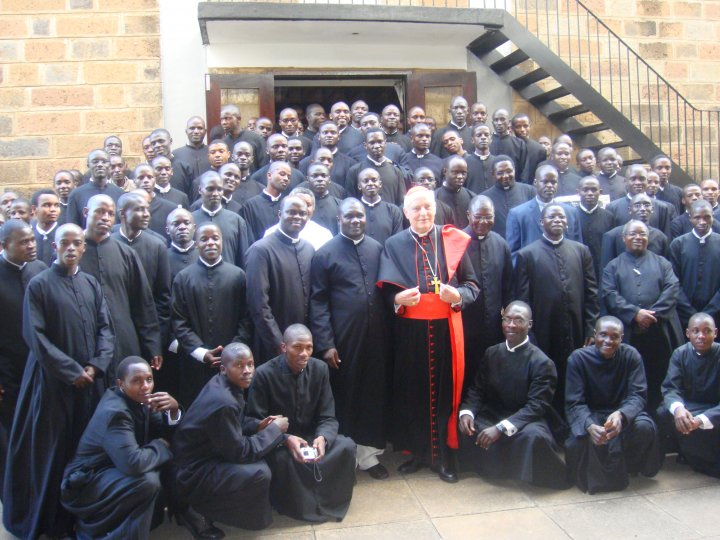
Zenon Cardinal Grocholewski, Prefect of the Congregation for Catholic Education, at St. Thomas Aquinas Seminary, Nairobi. (Mege Joshua)

== Appointments ==
2012 April 14	Consecrated the third Bishop of Ngong
2012 January	Pope Benedict XVI entrusted to him the pastoral care of the Diocese of Ngong
2010 January	Rector of St. Thomas Aquinas Major Seminary
2004	Vicar General of the Archdiocese of Kisumu
1999 - 2001	Secretary and Director of Finance of the Archdiocese of Kisumu
1998 - 2010	Parish Priest of Ojolla, (upon return to Kenya, from Rome)
After Ordination	St. Theresa’s Kibuye Cathedral and Barkorwa Catholic Church

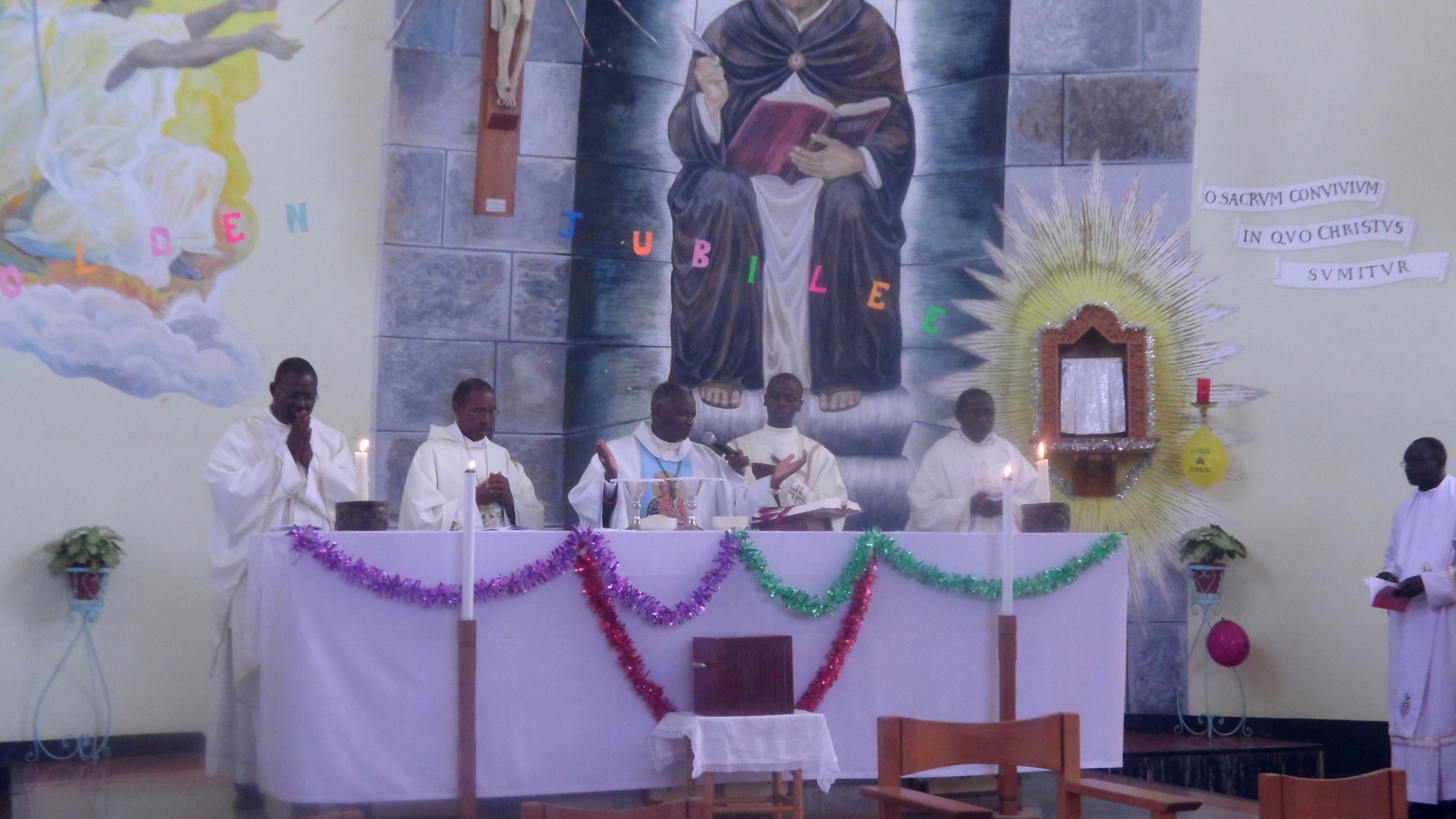
Mass by Bishop Paul Kariuki of Embu assisted by Bishop Peter Kihara (SEC), Msgr. John Oballa Owaa and Fr. Pancraesus Juma Mogaka

== Diocese of Ngong ==
The Diocese of Ngong covers an area of 47,000 square kilometres. At the time of the appointment of Msgr Oballa, the Diocese of Ngong had an approximated population of 1,011,000 people, with 83,247 Catholics. It had 29 parishes, 53 priests (39 diocesan and 14 religious), 40 religious brothers, 143 sisters and 19 seminarians.
