= Diocese of Kisii =

Roman Catholic diocese in Kenya

Coordinates: 0.6853°S 34.7748°E

Diocese of Kisii Dioecesis Kisiianus

Location
- Country: Kenya
- Metropolitan: Kisumu

Statistics
- Area: 2,196 km^{2} (848 sq mi)
- Population: Total; Catholics: (as of 2004); 1,800,000; 399,624 (22.2%)

Information
- Rite: Latin Rite

Current leadership
- Pope: Leo XIV
- Bishop: Joseph Mairura Okemwa
- Coadjutor: Joseph Onyango Oduor

The Roman Catholic Diocese of Kisii (Latin: Kisiian(us)) is a diocese located in the city of Kisii in the ecclesiastical province of Kisumu in Kenya.

== History ==
- May 21, 1960: Established as Diocese of Kisii from the Diocese of Kisumu

== Bishops ==
- Bishops of Kisii (Roman rite)
  - Bishop Maurice Michael Otunga (21 May 1960 – 15 Nov 1969), appointed Coadjutor Archbishop of Nairobi; future Cardinal
  - Bishop Tiberius Charles Mugendi (15 Nov 1969 – 17 Dec 1993)
  - Bishop Joseph Mairura Okemwa (since 19 Dec 1994)
  - Coadjutor Bishop Joseph Onyango Oduor (since 13 November 2026)

=== Other priest of this diocese who became bishop ===
- Joseph Obanyi Sagwe, appointed Bishop of Kakamega in 2014

== See also ==
- Roman Catholicism in Kenya
- Kenya Conference of Catholic Bishops

== Sources ==
- GCatholic.org
- Catholic Hierarchy
