= Cornelius Korir =

Kenyan Catholic prelate (1950 - 2017)

The Most Reverend Cornelius Kipng'eno Arap Korir
- Bishop of Eldoret
- Church: Catholic Church
- Archdiocese: Roman Catholic Archdiocese of Kisumu
- See: Roman Catholic Diocese of Eldoret
- Appointed: 2 April 1990
- Installed: 2 June 1990
- Term ended: 30 October 2017
- Predecessor: John Joseph Njenga (19 October 1970 - 25 October 1988)
- Successor: Dominic Kimengich (16 November 2019 - 28 January 2026)

Orders
- Ordination: 6 November 1982 by Raphael Simon Ndingi Mwana'a Nzeki
- Consecration: 2 June 1990 by Jozef Tomko
- Rank: Bishop

Personal details
- Born: Cornelius Kipng'eno Arap Korir; 6 July 1950 Segutiet, Nakuru County, Kenya
- Died: 30 October 2017 (aged 67) Eldoret, Uasin Gishu County, Kenya

Styles of Cornelius Kipng’eno Arap Korir
- Reference style: Your Lordship; The Most Reverend
- Spoken style: His Lordship
- Religious style: Bishop

Cornelius Kipng'eno Arap Korir (6 July 1950 – 30 October 2017) was a Kenyan Catholic prelate who served as Bishop of Eldoret from 1990 until his death in 2017.

== Background and education ==
He was born on 6 July 1950 in Segutiet Village, Bomet District, in the former Rift Valley Province of Kenya. He attended Segutiet Primary School until 1970. He studied at the Mother of Apostles Minor Seminary in Eldoret. He studied at the Saint Augustine Major Seminary in Bungoma, graduating with a diploma in the philosophy in 1982. He then transferred to the Saint Thomas Aquinas Major Seminary, in Nairobi, where he was awarded a diploma in theology. He continued schooling and was awarded a degree in sacred theology by Saint Patrick's College in Maynooth, Ireland in 1989.

== Priest ==
He was ordained a priest for the Catholic Diocese of Nakuru on 6 November 1982. He served as a priest until 2 April 1990.

== Bishop ==
On 2 April 1990, Pope John Paul II appointed Reverend Father Cornelius Kipng’eno Arap Korir, previously a member of the Clergy of the Catholic Dioese of Nakuru, as the new bishop of the diocese of Eldoret. He was consecrated and installed at Eldoret on 2 June 1990 by Cardinal Jozef Tomko, Cardinal-Deacon of Gesù Buon Pastore alla Montagnola assisted by Cardinal Maurice Michael Otunga, Archbishop of Nairobi and John Joseph Njenga, Archbishop of Mombasa.

== Legacy ==
Bishop Korir presided over the church at a time of many turbulent times in the North Rift during the 1992, 1997, and 2007/08 Kenyan post-election violence, and he played a major role in peace-building and uniting the communities living in this area. He received the distinguished service medal in recognition of this work, bestowed upon him by President Mwai Kibaki.

During his tenure, the church witnessed a sharp increase in church membership and the development of health and education institutions sponsored by the Roman Catholic church within the Diocese of Eldoret. He first came to wider notice after mediating between Marakwet and Pokot clashes at Kapsait, where he managed to build a church as a symbol of unity. In 1997 and 2007/08, he interceded in mediating peace among several communities that clashed due to election issues. He is believed to have housed more than 10,000 families affected by post-election violence that erupted in December 2007 and lasted through February 2008. In his mission of uniting, Korir wrote a book titled Amani Mashinani where he featured how he managed to unite communities.

He earned two awards through his mission of restoring peace in Turkana, Marakwet and Pokot. He first received a distinguished medal, Moran of the Burning Spear which was awarded by former president Mwai Kibaki. In 2009, he received the Milele Lifetime Award which was given by the National Commission of Human Rights. The peace ambassador started a radio station in the cathedral church of Eldoret in 2013 and named it Upendo FM (meaning "love").

He died in his house on the morning of Monday 30 October 2017. He was 67 years old. He was diagnosed with high blood pressure and diabetes which were not detected for a long time. He was buried inside the cathedral as the first bishop in the region to have died in the line of duty.

== See also ==
- Catholic Church in Kenya

== Succession table ==
Catholic Church titles
Preceded by John Joseph Njenga (19 October 1970 - 25 October 1988)	Bishop of Eldoret (2 April 1990 - 30 October 2017)	Succeeded by Dominic Kimengich (16 November 2019 - 28 January 2026)
