= Diocese of Ngong =

Roman Catholic diocese in Kenya

Diocese of Ngong Dioecesis Ngongensis

Location
- Country: Kenya
- Metropolitan: Nairobi

Statistics
- Area: 47,000 km^{2} (18,000 sq mi)
- Population: Total; Catholics: (as of 2004); 942,395; 74,634 (7.9%)

Information
- Rite: Latin Rite
- Cathedral: Cathedral of St. Joseph the Worker (dedicated 1st May 2015)

Current leadership
- Pope: Leo XIV
- Bishop: John Oballa Owaa
- Bishops emeritus: Cornelius Schilder, M.H.M.

The Roman Catholic Diocese of Ngong (Latin: Ngongen(sis)) is a diocese located in the city of Ngong in the ecclesiastical province of Nairobi in Kenya.

== History ==
- 20 October 1959: Established as Apostolic Prefecture of Ngong from Metropolitan Archdiocese of Nairobi and Diocese of Kisumu
- 9 December 1976: Promoted as Diocese of Ngong

== Leadership ==
- Prefects Apostolic of Ngong (Roman rite)
  - Father Joannes de Reeper, M.H.M. (1960–1964), appointed Bishop of Kisumu
  - Father Colin Cameron Davies, M.H.M. (1964–1976); see below
- Bishops of Ngong (Roman rite)
  - Bishop Colin Cameron Davies, M.H.M. (1976–2002); see above
  - Bishop Cornelius Schilder, M.H.M. (2002–2009)
  - Bishop John Oballa Owaa (2012-)

== See also ==
- Catholic Church in Kenya

== Sources ==
- GCatholic.org
- Catholic Hierarchy
