= Urci =

Coordinates: 36°54′47″N 02°27′08″W

Urci was an ancient settlement in southeastern Roman Hispania mentioned by Pomponius Mela, Pliny the Elder, and Claudius Ptolemy. The writings of these historians indicate that the city was located in the hinterland of what is now Villaricos, Spain, in the lower basin of the Almanzora River. Some modern encyclopedias and historians have wrongly located Urci at Pechina, El Chuche or the City of Almería.

Urci may be the town that emitted coins in the second century with the Iberian legend 'Urkesken', although these coins have some similarities with the coins of Kelin and Ikalesken (possibly Iniesta) from inland Valencia and eastern Cuenca.

Saint Indaletius, a Christian missionary of the 1st century (during the Apostolic Age), who is venerated as the patron saint of Almería, Spain, is said by tradition to have evangelized the town of Urci and become its first bishop. He may have been martyred at Urci. Urci is today a titular diocese of the Catholic Church.

== Bibliography ==
- Casado Baena, Mateo (2007). "Localizacion de la antigua ciudad de Urci y delimitacion de la frontera interprovincial entre las provincias Betica y Tarraconense en Tiempos de Tolomeo". Gerion. 25 (1): 391–400.
