= Philip Sulumeti =

Kenyan Roman Catholic prelate (1937–2025)

The Most Reverend Philip Sulumeti
- Bishop Emeritus of Kakamega
- Church: Catholic Church
- Archdiocese: Kisumu
- See: Kakamega
- Appointed: 28 May 1972
- Installed: 20 August 1972
- Predecessor: Position established
- Successor: Joseph Obanyi Sagwe
- Previous posts: Auxiliary Bishop of Kisumu and Titular Bishop of Urci (1972–1976); Bishop of Kisumu (1976–1978)

Orders
- Ordination: 6 January 1966 by Pope Paul VI
- Consecration: 20 August 1972 by Laurean Rugambwa, Maurice Michael Otunga and Joannes de Reeper

Personal details
- Born: Philip Sulumeti; 15 August 1937 Kotur, Busia County, Colony and Protectorate of Kenya
- Died: 9 November 2025 (aged 88) Nairobi, Kenya
- Motto: Ut Unum Sint

Philip Sulumeti (15 August 1937 – 9 November 2025) was a Kenyan prelate of the Catholic Church who served as the Bishop Emeritus of the Diocese of Kakamega from 5 December 2014 until his death. He had served as the ordinary of the Diocese of Kakamega since his appointment as its founding bishop on 28 February 1978. Before that, he had been the ordinary of the Diocese of Kisumu from 1976 until 1978, when he was transferred to Kakamega. He also served as the Auxiliary Bishop of the Roman Catholic Diocese of Kisumu from 1972 until 1976. He retired on 5 December 2014.

== Early life and education ==
Sulumeti was born on 15 August 1937 in Kotur Village, Teso South, Busia County in the Diocese of Bungoma. He attended primary school in his home area. He studied in seminaries in East Africa before he went to Rome, for further studies. He graduated from the St. Peter's Pontifical College, Rome, with a Licentiate and a Doctorate in Canon Law.

== Priest ==
Sulumeti was ordained priest on 6 January 1966 at Kisumu by Pope Paul VI. He served as priest for the Diocese of Kisumu until 28 May 1972, when he was appointed simultaneously as Auxiliary Bishop of Kisumu, Kenya and as Titular Bishop of Urci.

== Bishop ==
On 28 May 1972, Pope Paul VI appointed Sulumeti simultaneously as auxiliary bishop of the diocese of Kisumu and as Titular Bishop of Urci. He was consecrated bishop and installed by Archbishop Cardinal Laurean Rugambwa, Archbishop of Dar es Salaam assisted by Archbishop Maurice Michael Otunga, Archbishop of Nairobi and Bishop Joannes de Reeper, Bishop of Kisumu. Following the retirement of Bishop Joannes de Reeper on 20 March 1976, Bishop Sulumeti was appointed his replacement, and he served as Bishop of Kisumu until 28 February 1978, when he was appointed Bishop of Kakamega.

He was appointed the pioneer bishop of Kakamega on 28 February 1978, the same day Kisumu Diocese was split to create the new Diocese of Kakamega. He served in that capacity until 5 December 2014 when his third application for retirement was approved by Pope Francis, based on the bishop's age. Two earlier applications on medical grounds had been turned down by Pope John Paul II in 1994 and by Pope Benedict XVI in 2012. On his retirement day, his successor Bishop Joseph Obanyi Sagwe was consecrated and installed as the new ordinary for Kakamega Diocese.

== Death ==
Sulumeti died on 9 November 2025 at 11:00 p.m., while receiving treatment at Nairobi Hospital. He was 88. His death was announced by the Catholic Diocese of Kakamega on 10 November.

== Other considerations ==
Sulumeti is credited with spearheading the national constitutional review process in 2006. Due to his non-partisan stance and considerable legal expertise, he was able to moderate many contentious clauses in the document.

Catholic Church titles
Preceded by Position established	Bishop of Kakamega; 28 February 1978 – 5 December 2014	Succeeded by Joseph Obanyi Sagwe
Preceded by Joannes de Reeper	Bishop of Kisumu; 9 December 1976 – 28 February 1978	Succeeded by Zacchaeus Okoth
Unknown	Auxiliary Bishop of Kisumu; 28 May 1972 – 9 December 1976	Unknown
Francis Xavier Sanguon Souvannasri	Titular Bishop of Urci; 28 May 1972 – 9 December 1976	Succeeded by Jean-Paul Labrie
