= Diocese of Kakamega =

Roman Catholic diocese in Kenya

Coordinates: 0.2872°N 34.7619°E

Diocese of Kakamega Dioecesis Kakamegaensis

Location
- Country: Kenya
- Metropolitan: Kisumu

Statistics
- Area: 3,517 km^{2} (1,358 sq mi)
- Population: Total; Catholics: 1,988,123; 342,123 (17.2%)

Information
- Rite: Latin Rite

Current leadership
- Pope: Leo XIV
- Bishop: Joseph Obanyi Sagwe

The Roman Catholic Diocese of Kakamega (Latin: Kakamegaën(sis)) is a diocese located in the city of Kakamega in the ecclesiastical province of Kisumu in Kenya.

== History ==
- February 27, 1978: Established as Diocese of Kakamega from the Diocese of Kisumu

== Bishops ==
- Bishops of Kakamega (Roman rite)
  - Bishop Philip Sulumeti (February 27, 1978 -December 5, 2014 )
  - Bishop Joseph Obanyi Sagwe (since December 5, 2014)

=== Another priest of this diocese who became bishop ===
- Maurice Muhatia Makumba, appointed Bishop of Nakuru in 2009

== See also ==
- Roman Catholicism in Kenya
- Diocese of Kakamega

== Sources ==
- GCatholic.org
- Catholic Hierarchy
