= Dominic Kimengich =

Kenyan Catholic prelate (born 1961)

The Most Reverend Dominic Kimengich
- Coadjutor Archbishop of Mombasa, Kenya
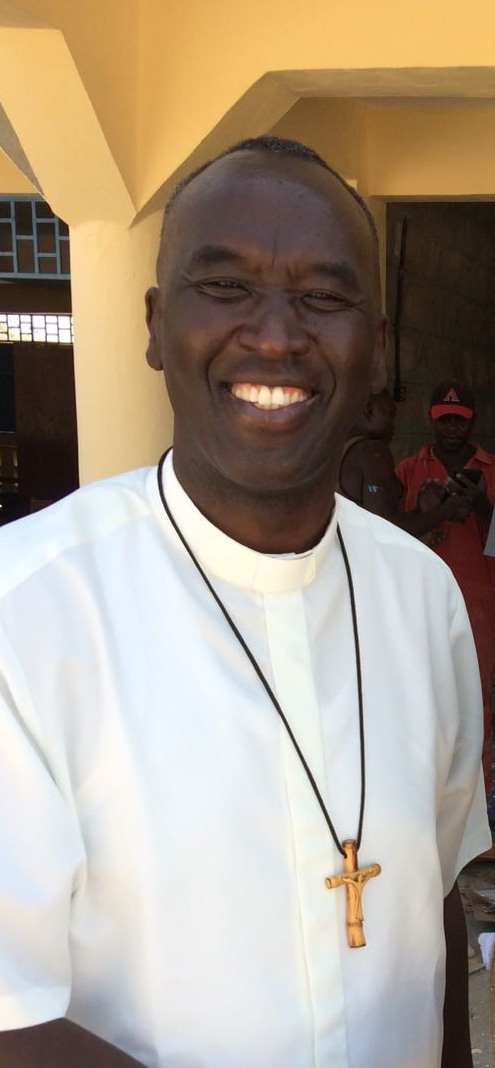
- Archbishop Dominic Kimengich
- Church: Catholic Church
- Archdiocese: Roman Catholic Archdiocese of Mombasa
- See: Mombasa
- Appointed: 28 January 2026
- Other posts: 1. Auxiliary Bishop of Lodwar (20 March 2010 - 6 March 2011); 2. Bishop of Lodwar (5 March 2011 - 16 November 2019); 3. Apostolic Administrator of Lodwar (1 February 2020 - 4 June 2022); 4. Bishop of Eldoret (16 November 2019 - 28 January 2026)

Orders
- Ordination: 14 September 1986
- Consecration: 22 May 2010 by John Cardinal Njue
- Rank: Archbishop

Personal details
- Born: Dominic Kimengich; 23 April 1961 (age 65) Kituro, Baringo County, Diocese of Nakuru, Kenya
- Motto: "Serviamus Domino in lætitia" (Let us serve the Lord in gladness)

Styles of Dominic Kimengich
- Reference style: Your Lordship; The Most Reverend
- Spoken style: His Lordship
- Religious style: Archbishop

Dominic Kimengich (born 23 April 1961) is a Kenyan Catholic prelate who was appointed Coadjutor Archbishop of the Archdiocese of Mombasa in Kenya on 28 January 2026. Before that, from 16 November 2019 until 28 January 2026, he was the bishop of the Roman Catholic Diocese of Eldoret in Kenya. Prior to that, from 5 March 2011 until 16 November 2019, he was the Bishop of the Roman Catholic Diocese of Lodwar in Kenya. From 20 March 2010 until 5 March 2011, he was auxiliary bishop of Lodwar and concurrently Titular Bishop of Tanaramusa. He was appointed bishop on 20 March 2010 by Pope Benedict XVI. He was consecrated bishop on 22 May 2010. He succeeded Bishop Patrick Joseph Harrington at Lodwar on 5 March 2011, when Bishop Harrington resigned. On 16 November 2019, Pope Francis transferred him to Eldoret and made him the Local Ordinary there. He was installed at Eldoret on 1 February 2020. While bishop of Eldoret, he contemporaneously served as Apostolic Administrator of the diocese of Lodwar from 1 February 2020 until 4 June 2022.

== Background and education ==
Dominic Kimengich was born on 23 April 1961, at Kituro Village, near the current Saint Joseph The Worker Parish in Kituro, Baringo County, Diocese of Nakuru, in Kenya. He studied philosophy at Saint Augustine Major Seminary in Mabanga, Bungoma County. He then studied theology at Saint Thomas Aquinas Major Seminary in Nairobi. He holds a Licentiate and a Doctorate in Canon Law, awarded by the Pontifical University of the Holy Cross in Rome, Italy.

== Priest ==
On 14 September 1986, he was ordained a priest for the Catholic Diocese of Nakuru. He served as priest until 20 March 2010.

While a priest, he served in various roles and locations including:

- Assistant priest at Ndanai parish in Bomet from 1986 until 1988.
- Pastor of the parish in Kipsaraman from 1988 until 1993.
- Studies at the Pontifical University of the Holy Cross in Rome, leading to the award of a Licentiate and a Doctorate in Canon Law, from 1993 until 1997.
- Rector of the Saint Joseph Minor Seminary in Molo, Nakuru County from 1997 until 2001.
- Vicar General of the Diocese of Nakuru from 2001 until 2007.
- Diocesan Human Resource Manager for Nakuru Diocese from 2002 until 2004.
- Administrator of the cathedral parish of Nakuru from 2002 until 2007.
- Rector of the St. Matthias Mulumba Tindinyo Seminary from 2007 until 2008.
- Judge of the Diocesan Court of Nakuru since 2003.
- Member of the Bishops' Commission for Liturgy since 2007.
- Head of Canonical Office of the Kenyan Bishops' Conference since 2008.
- Member of the Bishops' Commission for the Doctrine of the Faith since 2009.

== Bishop ==
Pope Benedict XVI appointed him Auxiliary Bishop of the Roman Catholic Diocese of Lodwar on 20 March 2010. He was contemporaneously appointed Titular Bishop of Tanaramusa. He was consecrated as bishop on 22 May 2010. The Principal Consecrator was Cardinal John Njue, Archbishop of Nairobi assisted by Zacchaeus Okoth, Archbishop of Kisumu and Patrick Joseph Harrington, Bishop of Lodwar.

On 5 March 2011, Pope Benedict XVI accepted the resignation from pastoral care of the Catholic Diocese of Lodwar presented by Bishop Patrick Joseph Harrington. The Holy Father appointed Dominic Kimengich, previously auxiliary bishop of the same diocese, as the new local ordinary at Lodwar.

On 16 November 2019, Pope Francis transferred Bishop Dominic Kimengich from Lodwar to Eldoret and appointed him the bishop there. He succeeded Bishop Cornelius Kipng'eno Arap Korir, the previous local ordinary who died in office on 30 October 2017. Bishop Kimengich was installed at Eldoret on 1 February 2020.

While bishop at Eldoret, he was appointed apostolic administrator of the diocese of Lodwar on 1 February 2020. That administratorship ceased on 4 June 2022, the day Bishop John Mbinda was installed as the new local ordinary at Lodwar.

On 28 January 2026, Pope Leo XIV transferred him to the Archidiocese of Mombasa and appointed him Coadjutor Archbishop there. He is expected to work with and assist Archbishop Martin Kivuva Musonde, who has about one year left before he attains the mandatory retirement age of 75 years. Archbishop Kimengich has the right to succeed at Mombasa, when that position falls vacant in the future.

== See also ==
- Catholic Church in Kenya

== Succession table ==
Catholic Church titles
Preceded by	CoAdjutor Bishop of Mombasa (since 28 January 2026)	Succeeded by
Preceded by Cornelius Kipng'eno Arap Korir (2 April 1990 - 30 October 2017)	Bishop of Eldoret (16 November 2019 - 28 January 2026)	Succeeded by Vacant
Preceded by Patrick Joseph Harrington (17 February 2000 - 5 March 2011)	Bishop of Lodwar (5 March 2011 - 16 November 2019)	Succeeded by John Mbinda (since 4 April 2022)
Preceded by	Auxiliary Bishop of Lodwar (20 March 2010 - 5 March 2011	Succeeded by
