= Mill Hill Missionaries =

Roman Catholic society of apostolic life

Saint Joseph's Missionary Society of Mill Hill
- Societas Missionariorum S. Ioseph de Mill Hill
- Abbreviation: MHM
- Formation: March 19, 1866 (160 years ago)
- Founder: Herbert Vaughan, MHM
- Type: Society of Apostolic Life of Pontifical Right (for Men)
- Headquarters: Maidenhead, United Kingdom
- Members: 585 members (311 priests) (2018)
- Superior General: Michael Corcoran, MHM
- Parent organization: Catholic Church
- Website: millhillmissionaries.com

The Mill Hill Missionaries (MHM), officially known as the Saint Joseph's Missionary Society of Mill Hill (Latin: Societas Missionariorum S. Ioseph de Mill Hill), is a Catholic society of apostolic life founded by Herbert Vaughan in 1866.

== History ==
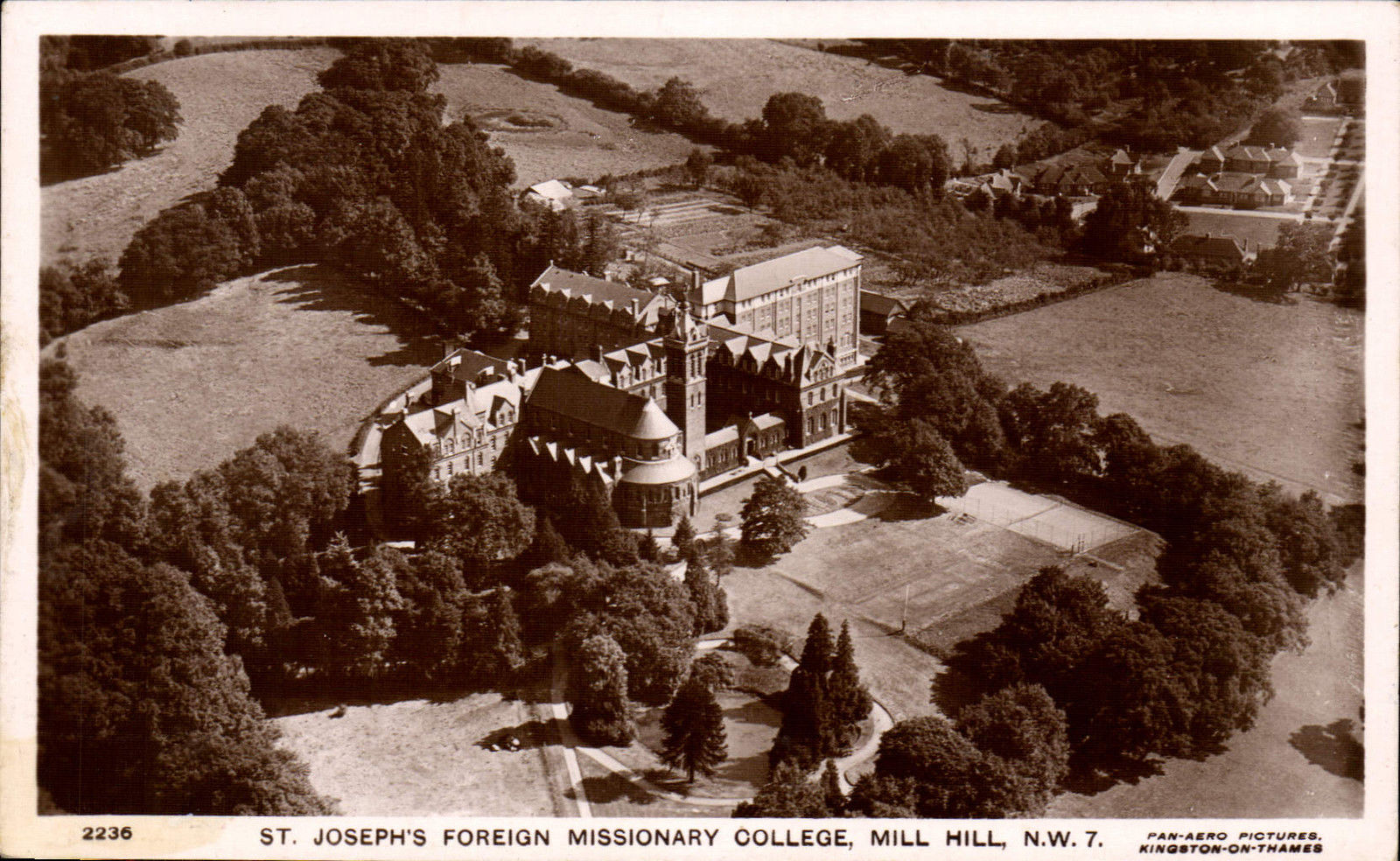
St. Joseph's College (closed in 2006)

The society was founded in 1866 by Herbert Vaughan, who taught that the society's charism was "to go where the need is greatest".

In 1871, Pope Pius IX requested members be sent to America to work with the newly freed African Americans. In 1892, the members in North American were granted independence as the Society of Saint Joseph of the Sacred Heart (Josephites), was formed.

The society was formerly based at St Joseph's College at Mill Hill in north London. The late 1960s saw the development of the Missionary Institute of London to consolidate training facilities for the various mission societies in Britain. St Joseph's College site was closed in 2006. Its present headquarters are at 6 Colby Gardens in Maidenhead, Berkshire SL6 7GZ.

In 1884, St Peter's School, Freshfield, near Liverpool was founded to serve as a preparatory school to the college.

During the Second World War. the college was evacuated to Lochwinnoch in Scotland. The war ministry then requisitioned part of the buildings for the use of the civil service; the college at Mill Hill was effectively closed for the duration of the war. In the 1960s, Pope John XXIII asked missionary societies to become involved in South America. As of 2019, the Mill Hill Missionaries are active in Brazil and Ecuador.

On its 150th anniversary, an account of its history on the Diocese of Westminster website said in part: "At the 1988 Chapter, with representatives from all over the Mill Hill world present, a decision was taken to recruit Mill Hill Missionaries from Africa and Asia, our former mission areas, now flourishing with well-established churches planted and grown by Mill Hill Missionaries." There are now Mill Hill Society formation centres in Cameroon, East Africa, the Philippines, and India.

As of 2014, the congregation has forty priests working within Ireland and twenty working internationally, with an average age of 73.

== Superiors general ==
- Herbert Vaughan (1868–1903), founder
- Rev. Arthur Henry MHM (1904–1924)
- Bishop John Henry Mary Biermans (1924–1934)
- Rev. Stephen O’Callaghan (1934–1947)
- Very Rev. Thomas McLaughlin (1947–1962)
- Very Rev. Gerald Mahon (1963–1970)
- Rev. Noel Hanrahan (1970–1982)
- Bishop Cornello de Wit (1982–1988)
- Rev. Maurice McGill (1988–2000)
- Jac Hetsen, Netherlands (2000–2005)
- Anthony Chantry, England (UK) (2005–2015)
- Michael Corcoran, Ireland (2015 – present)

== Prelates from their ranks ==
- Colin Cameron Davies, Bishop Emeritus, Diocese of Ngong, Kenya
- Cornelius Schilder, Bishop Emeritus of Ngong, Kenya
- Ignatius Arnoz
- John Anthony Kaiser
- Henricus Cornelius de Wit, M.H.M., Bishop Emeritus of the Roman Catholic Diocese of Antique, Philippines

== See also ==
- Alice Ingham, who founded the Franciscan order of Sisters of St. Joseph's Society for Foreign Missions
