= Zacchaeus Okoth =

Kenyan Roman Catholic archbishop

- Archbishop Emeritus of Kisumu
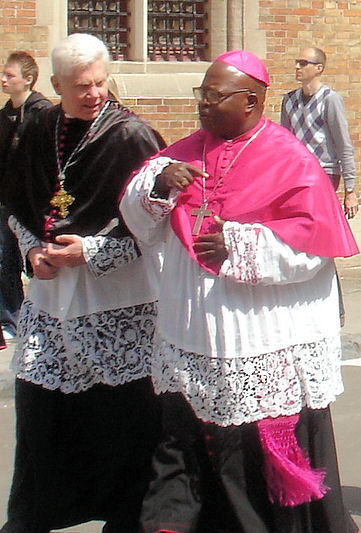
- Procession of the Holy Blood, Mgr. Zacchaeus Okoth in 2009 (right)
- Church: Catholic Church
- Archdiocese: Archdiocese of Kisumu
- In office: 27 February 1978 – 15 November 2018
- Predecessor: Philip Sulumeti
- Successor: Philip Anyolo

Orders
- Ordination: 14 November 1968
- Consecration: 30 April 1978 by Maurice Michael Otunga

Personal details
- Born: 5 July 1942 (age 84) Nyakach (in southern present-day Kisumu County), Colony and Protectorate of Kenya, British Empire

Mgr. Zacchaeus Okoth (born 5 July 1942) is a retired Roman Catholic Archbishop of Kisumu in Kenya.

== Biography ==
Okoth was ordained a priest on 13 November 1968. He was appointed Bishop of Kisumu on 27 February 1978, and became Archbishop when Kisumu was elevated to an archdiocese in 1990. Okoth was actively involved in politics during his career, having argued that the passage of the 2010 constitutional referendum was not enough to end the "culture of impunity among political leadership". Okoth retired in 2019 after over five decades as a priest.

== Corruption allegations ==
Okoth has been accused by parish officials and other priests of corruption. According to one report, Okoth routinely mismanaged church funds and went as far as to harass other priests.

== Sources ==
- Catholic Hierarchy: Zacchaeus Okoth
