= Archdiocese of Eldoret =

Roman Catholic archdiocese in Kenya

Coordinates: 0.5174°N 35.2793°E

Archdiocese of Eldoret Archidioecesis Eldoretensis

Location
- Country: Kenya

Statistics
- Area: 9,254 km^{2} (3,573 sq mi)
- Population: Total; Catholics: (as of 2006); 1,623,648; 401,703 (24.7%)

Information
- Rite: Latin Rite
- Cathedral: Sacred Heart of Jesus Cathedral

Current leadership
- Pope: Leo XIV
- Metropolitan Archbishop: Joseph Obanyi Sagwe

The Roman Catholic Archdiocese of Eldoret (Latin: Eldoreten(sis)) is a Metropolitan See for the ecclesiastical province based in the city of Eldoret in Kenya.

== History ==
- June 29, 1953: Established as Apostolic Prefecture of Eldoret from the Diocese of Kisumu
- October 13, 1959: Promoted as Diocese of Eldoret
- July 10, 2025: Lost territory to form the Diocese of Kapsabet
- November 14, 2026: Promoted as Metropolitan Archdiocese of Eldoret

== Suffragan dioceses ==
The Metropolitan See comprises the following:

- Roman Catholic Archdiocese of Eldoret and the suffragans of
  - Roman Catholic Diocese of Kapsabet
  - Roman Catholic Diocese of Kitale
  - Roman Catholic Diocese of Kericho
  - Roman Catholic Diocese of Lodwar

== Bishops ==
=== Ordinaries ===
- Prefect Apostolic of Eldoret (Roman rite)
  - Father Joseph Brendan Houlihan, S.P.S. (1954 - 13 Oct 1959); see below
- Bishops of Eldoret (Roman rite)
  - Bishop Joseph Brendan Houlihan, S.P.S. (13 Oct 1959 – 19 Oct 1970); see above
  - Bishop John Njenga (19 Oct 1970 – 25 Oct 1988), appointed Bishop of Mombasa; future Archbishop
  - Bishop Cornelius Kipng'eno Arap Korir (2 April 1990 – 30 October 2017); given the 2009 Milele lifetime achievement award from Kenya's National Commission on Human Rights. Died in office on 30 October 2017.
  - Bishop Dominic Kimengich (16 November 2019 - 28 January 2026), appointed Coadjutor Archbishop of Mombasa.
- Archbishops of Eldoret (Roman rite)
  - Archbishop Joseph Obanyi Sagwe (since 14 November 2026)

=== Auxiliary bishops ===
  - John Kiplimo Lelei (27 March 2024 - 10 Jul 2025). Appointed Bishop of Kapsabet (since 10 July 2025)

== See also ==
- Roman Catholicism in Kenya
- Kenya Conference of Catholic Bishops
