= Maurice Muhatia Makumba =

Kenyan Catholic prelate

The Most Reverend Maurice Muhatia Makumba
- Archbishop
- Church: Catholic Church
- Archdiocese: Roman Catholic Archdiocese of Kisumu
- Appointed: 18 February 2022
- Predecessor: Philip Arnold Subira Anyolo
- Successor: Incumbent

Orders
- Ordination: 15 October 1994
- Consecration: 27 February 2010 by Cardinal John Njue
- Rank: Bishop

Personal details
- Born: Maurice Muhatia Makumba; 19 May 1968 (age 57); Lirhanda, Kakamega County, Kenya

Styles of Maurice Muhatia Makumba
- Reference style: The Most Reverend
- Religious style: Archbishop

Maurice Muhatia Makumba (born 19 May 1968) is a Kenyan Catholic prelate who serves as Archbishop of the Roman Catholic Archdiocese of Kisumu. He was appointed Archbishop of Kisumu on 18 February 2022.

== Background and education ==
He was born on 19 May 1968, in Lirhanda Village, Kakamega County, Kenya. He attended elementary school in his home area. He completed his secondary education at St. Charles Lwanga Seminary. He then joined St. Mary's Major Seminary to begin his religious formation education.

He holds a Bachelor's degree awarded by the Pontifical Urban University in Rome. He also graduated with a Master's degree from the Pontifical University of the Holy Cross, also in Rome. He was then awarded a Doctorate degree in Philosophy by the Pontifical University of the Holy Cross.

== Priest ==
He was ordained a priest on 15 October 1994. As priest of the diocese of Kakamega, he served in several roles inside and outside the diocese. He served as a Priest of Kakamega Diocese until 19 December 2009.

== As bishop ==
Father Makumba was appointed Bishop of Roman Catholic Diocese of Nakuru on 19 December 2009 and received episcopal consecration at the showground of the Agricultural Society of Kenya, Nakuru, in the Diocese of Nakuru, on 27 February 2010. The Principal Consecrator was Cardinal John Njue, Archbishop of Nairobi, assisted by Bishop Philip Arnold Subira Anyolo, Bishop of Homa Bay and Bishop Philip Sulumeti, Bishop of Kakamega. Bishop Makumba was appointed Apostolic Administrator of the Roman Catholic Archdiocese of Kisumu on 20 November 2021, while still Bishop of Nakuru. At the time Pope Benedict XVI appointed him bishop, Bishop Makumba, aged 41 years, was the youngest Catholic bishop in Kenya.

During that time as Bishop of Nakuru, he served in various roles including as:

- Vice chairman of the Kenya Conference of Catholic Bishops (KCCB)
- Principal administrator of the Kenya Catholic Secretariat
- Chairman of the KCCB commission for education and religious education
- Part-time National Executive Secretary for the KCCB Commission for Doctrine.

On 18 February 2022, Pope Francis appointed Bishop Anthony Makamba as Archbishop of the Archdiocese of Kisumu.

== See also ==
- Catholic Church in Kenya

== Succession table ==
Catholic Church titles
Philip Arnold Subira Anyolo (15 November 2008 - 28 October 2021)	Archbishop of Kisumu (Since 18 February 2022)	Succeeded by Incumbent
Preceded by Peter Joseph Kairo (21 April 1997 - 19 April 2008)	Bishop of Nakuru (19 December 2009 - 18 February 2022)	Succeeded by Cleophas Oseso Tuka (15 February 2023 - present)
