= Archdiocese of Kisumu =

Roman Catholic archdiocese in Kenya

Coordinates: 0.0917°S 34.7671°E

Archdiocese of Kisumu Archidioecesis Kisumuensis Latin Church
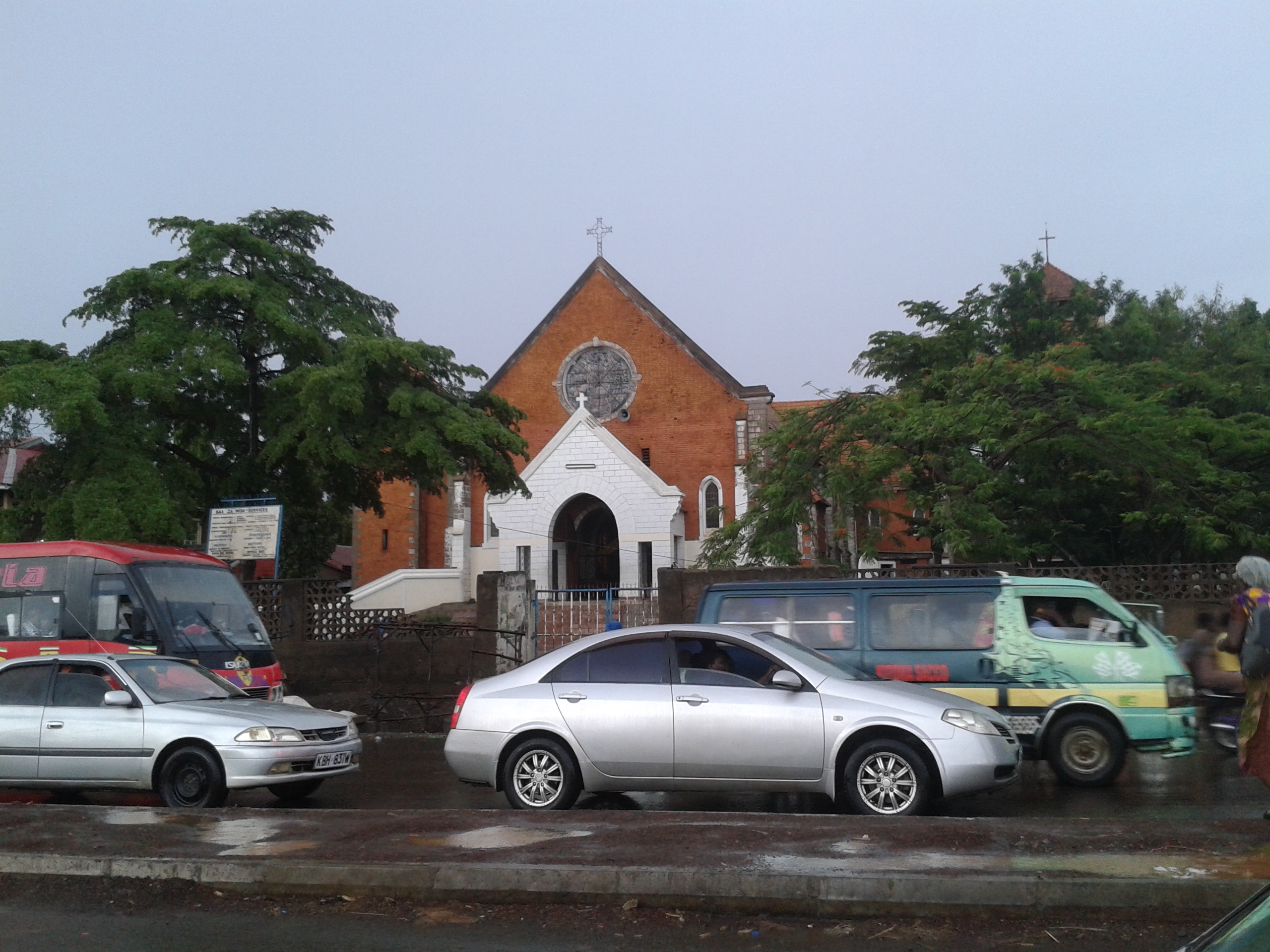
- Cathedral of St Therese of Lisieux in Kisumu, Kenya

Location
- Country: Kenya

Statistics
- Area: 4,616 km^{2} (1,782 sq mi)
- Population: Total; Catholics: 3,443,161; 1,936,400 (56.2%)
- Parishes: 60

Information
- Denomination: Catholicism
- Rite: Roman
- Established: July 15, 1925
- Secular priests: 76
- Metropolitan Archbishop: Maurice Muhatia Makumba
- Suffragans: Bungoma, Eldoret, Homa Bay, Kakamega, Kapsabet, Kisii, Kitale, Lodwar
- Bishops emeritus: Zacchaeus Okoth

The Roman Catholic Archdiocese of Kisumu (Latin: Kisumuen(sis)) is the Latin Metropolitan See for the ecclesiastical province of Kisumu in western Kenya.

The cathedral archiepiscopal see is St. Theresa’s Cathedral, in Kisumu, Kisumu County.

== Statistics ==
As per 2014, it pastorally served 898,036 Catholics (35.5% of 2,531,000 total on 4,616 km² in 41 parishes and a mission with 95 priests (70 diocesan, 25 religious), 349 lay religious (49 brothers, 300 sisters) and 35 seminarians.

== Ecclesiastical province ==
Its Suffragan sees are:

- Roman Catholic Diocese of Bungoma
- Roman Catholic Diocese of Eldoret
- Roman Catholic Diocese of Homa Bay
- Roman Catholic Diocese of Kakamega
- Roman Catholic Diocese of Kapsabet
- Roman Catholic Diocese of Kisii
- Roman Catholic Diocese of Kitale
- Roman Catholic Diocese of Lodwar

== History ==
- Established on 15 Jul 1925 as Apostolic Prefecture of Kavirondo, on territory split off from the then Apostolic Vicariate of Upper Nile in Uganda
- Promoted on 27 May 1932 as Apostolic Vicariate of Kisumu
- Promoted on 25 Mar 1953 as Diocese of Kisumu
- Lost territories repeatedly : on 29 Jun 1953 to establish the then Apostolic Prefecture of Eldoret, on 20 Oct 1959 to establish the then Apostolic Prefecture of Ngong, on 21 May 1960 to establish Diocese of Kisii, on 11 Jan 1968 to establish Diocese of Nakuru, on 27 Feb 1978 to establish Diocese of Kakamega
- Promoted on 21 May 1990 as Metropolitan Archdiocese of Kisumu

== Bishops ==
=== Ordinaries ===
(all Roman rite)

Apostolic Prefect of Kavirondo

- Gorgonio Brandsma, Mill Hill Missionaries (M.H.M.) (born Netherlands) (2 Dec 1925 – 27 May 1932 see below)

Apostolic Vicars of Kisumu

- Gorgonio Brandsma, M.H.M. ( see above 27 May 1932 – death 20 Jun 1935), Titular Bishop of Bargala (1933 – 20 Jun 1935)
- Nicolas Stam, M.H.M. (born Netherlands) (9 Mar 1936 – retired 1946), Titular Bishop of Cediæ (9 Mar 1936 – 26 May 1949); died 1949
- Frederick Hall, M.H.M. (born England, UK) (9 Apr 1948 – 25 Mar 1953 see below), Titular Bishop of Alba Marittima (9 Apr 1948 – 25 Mar 1953)

Suffragan Bishops of Kisumu

- Frederick Hall, M.H.M. (see above 25 Mar 1953 – retired 2 Dec 1963), emeritate as Titular Bishop of Castra nova (2 Dec 1963 – resigned 27 Jul 1976), died 1988
- Joannes de Reeper, M.H.M. (born Netherlands) (16 Jan 1964 – retired 20 Mar 1976), died 1980; previously Apostolic Prefect of Ngong (Kenya) (15 Jan 1960 – 16 Jan 1964)
- Philip Sulumeti (first Kenyan incumbent) (9 Dec 1976 – 28 Feb 1978), succeeding as previous Titular Bishop of Urci (28 May 1972 – 9 Dec 1976) and Auxiliary Bishop of Kisumu (28 May 1972 – 9 Dec 1976); next Bishop of Kakamega (Kenya) (28 Feb 1978 – retired 5 Dec 2014)
- Zacchaeus Okoth (27 Feb 1978 – 21 May 1990 see below)

Metropolitan Archbishops of Kisumu

- Zacchaeus Okoth (see above 21 May 1990 – retired 12 Jan 2019), also President of Kenya Conference of Catholic Bishops (1991 – 1997)
- Philip Arnold Subira Anyolo (12 Jan 2019 – 28 October 2021); next Metropolitan Archbishop of Nairobi (28 October 2021- ...)
- Maurice Muhatia Makumba (18 February 2022-...)

=== Auxiliary Bishops ===
- Maurice Michael Otunga (1956-1960), appointed Bishop of Kisii; future Cardinal
- Philip Sulumeti (1972-1976), appointed Bishop here
- Vicent Ouma Odundo (2025 - )

=== Other priests of this diocese who became bishops ===
- John Oballa Owaa, appointed Bishop of Ngong in 2012
- Emmanuel Okombo Wandera (priest here, 1972-1987), appointed Bishop of Kericho in 2003
- Linus Okok Okwach, appointed bishop of Homa Bay 18 October 1993, resigned, 20 Feb 2002, died 12 September 2020

== See also ==
- List of Catholic dioceses in Kenya

== Sources and external links ==
- GCatholic.org - data for all sections
