= Inauguration of Pope John Paul II =

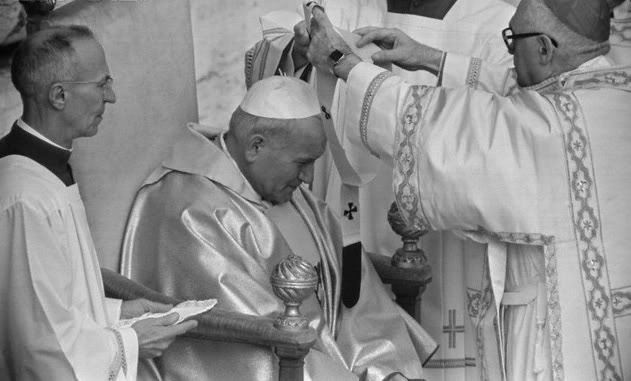
- Imposition of the pallium to Pope John Paul II by Cardinal Pericle Felici during his inauguration
- Date: 22 October 1978
- Venue: St. Peter's Square
- Location: Vatican City
- Type: Papal inauguration

The papal inauguration of Pope John Paul II took place on 22 October 1978. This inauguration was unique for being the second one in 1978 after the sudden death of Pope John Paul I one month prior. Representatives from many countries and denominations were present, including King Baudouin and Queen Fabiola of Belgium and King Juan Carlos and Queen Sofía of Spain.

== Preparation ==
In line with Pope John Paul II's predecessor, he chose not to be crowned with the papal tiara, but a mitre instead. Therefore, it was called an inauguration and not a coronation. Instead of being held in the evening like John Paul I, he chose to have his inauguration in the morning.

The evening prior to the ceremony, Pope John Paul II met with representatives of the Anglican, Presbyterian, and Armenian Protestant churches, as well as representatives of the Ecumenical Patriarchate of Constantinople.

== Ceremony ==
The ceremony began in the morning with prayers at Saint Peter's tomb underneath the baldachin of the high altar of St. Peter's Basilica. A procession went to St. Peter's Square where Cardinal Pericle Felici placed the pallium on the shoulders of the pontiff. Each cardinal then came forward individually to vow obedience and kiss the pope's ring. When John Paul II stood up as the Polish prelate, Cardinal Stefan Wyszyński stopped him from kissing the ring, and embraced him.

The primary language of the Mass was Latin. The pope gave his homily in Latin and asked for support of all Christians worldwide as well as thanking the crowd for coming to the inauguration. He famously said the words "Do not be afraid! Open wide the doors for Christ… Christ knows 'what is in man'. He alone knows it." Referring to coronation with the papal tiara, he said: "This is not the time to return to a ceremony and an object considered, wrongly, to be a symbol of the temporal power of the Popes." Many credit him for laying down that a solemn ceremony for the inauguration should take place and not an elaborate coronation; all modern popes have followed in his decision.

At the end of the ceremony, the pope gave the traditional Urbi et Orbi blessing.

There would not be another papal inauguration until 2005, following John Paul II's death and the 2005 conclave, when Benedict XVI's inauguration occurred.

== Attendees ==
Around hundreds of thousands of people were in attendance in St. Peter's Square. King Baudouin and Queen Fabiola of Belgium and King Juan Carlos and Queen Sofía of Spain were in attendance, as well as Grand Duke Jean and Duchess Joséphine-Charlotte of Luxembourg, Prince Rainier and Princess Grace of Monaco, and Princess Gina of Liechtenstein.
