= Inauguration of Pope Benedict XVI =

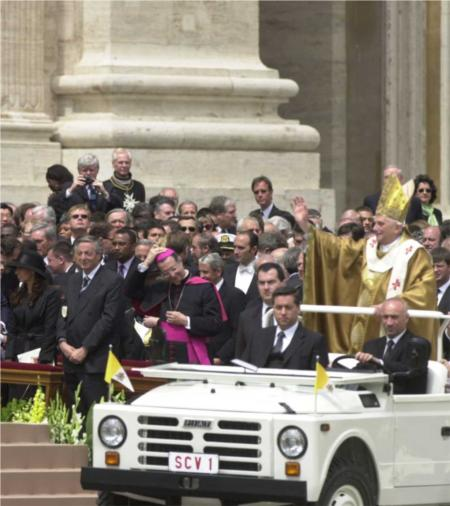
- Pope Benedict XVI riding in the popemobile for the first time during his inauguration
- Date: 24 April 2005
- Venue: St. Peter's Square
- Location: Vatican City
- Type: Papal inauguration

The papal inauguration of Pope Benedict XVI took place on 24 April 2005. This inauguration was the first one in over 25 years, since the inauguration of Pope John Paul II. Representatives from many countries and denominations were present, including King Juan Carlos and Queen Sophie of Spain, Prince Philip of Britain, and Jeb Bush, representing his brother, President George W. Bush.

== Preparation ==
Following Benedict XVI's predecessors, he chose to not be crowned with the papal tiara but a mitre instead. Therefore, it was called an inauguration and not a coronation. He was elected on 19 April 2005 and approved reforms for simplifying papal inauguration procedures the following day.

The evening prior to the ceremony, Pope Benedict XVI met with representatives of the Anglican, Presbyterian, and Armenian Protestant churches, as well as representatives of the Ecumenical Patriarchate of Constantinople. Rowan Williams, the archbishop of Canterbury, represented the Anglican Church.

== Ceremony ==
The ceremony began in the morning with prayers at Saint Peter's tomb underneath the baldachin of the high altar of St. Peter's Basilica. Subsequently, the new pope and the cardinals went in procession to Saint Peter's Square for the inauguration Mass while the "Laudes Regiæ" was being chanted, a hymn used to ask for guidance from God for the new pope. In St. Peter's Square, Benedict XVI was invested with the Pallium by Cardinal Jorge Medina, who was the cardinal protodeacon. After the pallium was bestowed and before the Ring of the Fisherman was presented, Cardinal Stephen Kim Sou-hwan, as the senior cardinal priest, pronounced the formal prayer for the new pope. The Ring of the Fisherman was presented by Cardinal Angelo Sodano, the vice dean of the college of cardinals and secretary of state, while the pope himself was dean so he put the ring on by himself.

Twelve people paid homage to the pope: Senior Cardinal Bishop Angelo Sodano, Cardinal Protopriest Stephen Kim Sou-hwan, Cardinal Protodeacon Jorge Medina, Bishop Andrea Erba, Father Enrico Pomili, a Benedictine nun, a deacon, a Korean married couple, a religious brother, a young man from the Democratic Republic of the Congo, and a young woman from Sri Lanka.

The primary language of the Mass was Latin. The pope gave his homily in Italian and declared that "the Church is alive" while calling for unity among believers.

At the end of the ceremony, the pope gave the traditional Urbi et Orbi blessing.

== Attendees ==
Hundreds of thousands of people were in attendance in St. Peter's Square. German Chancellor Gerhard Schroeder, German President Horst Koehler, Spain's King Juan Carlos and Queen Sofia, as well as Britain's Prince Philip, Prince Albert of Monaco, and Jeb Bush, governor of Florida and brother of President George W. Bush, were among those in attendance.
