= Inauguration of Pope Leo XIV =

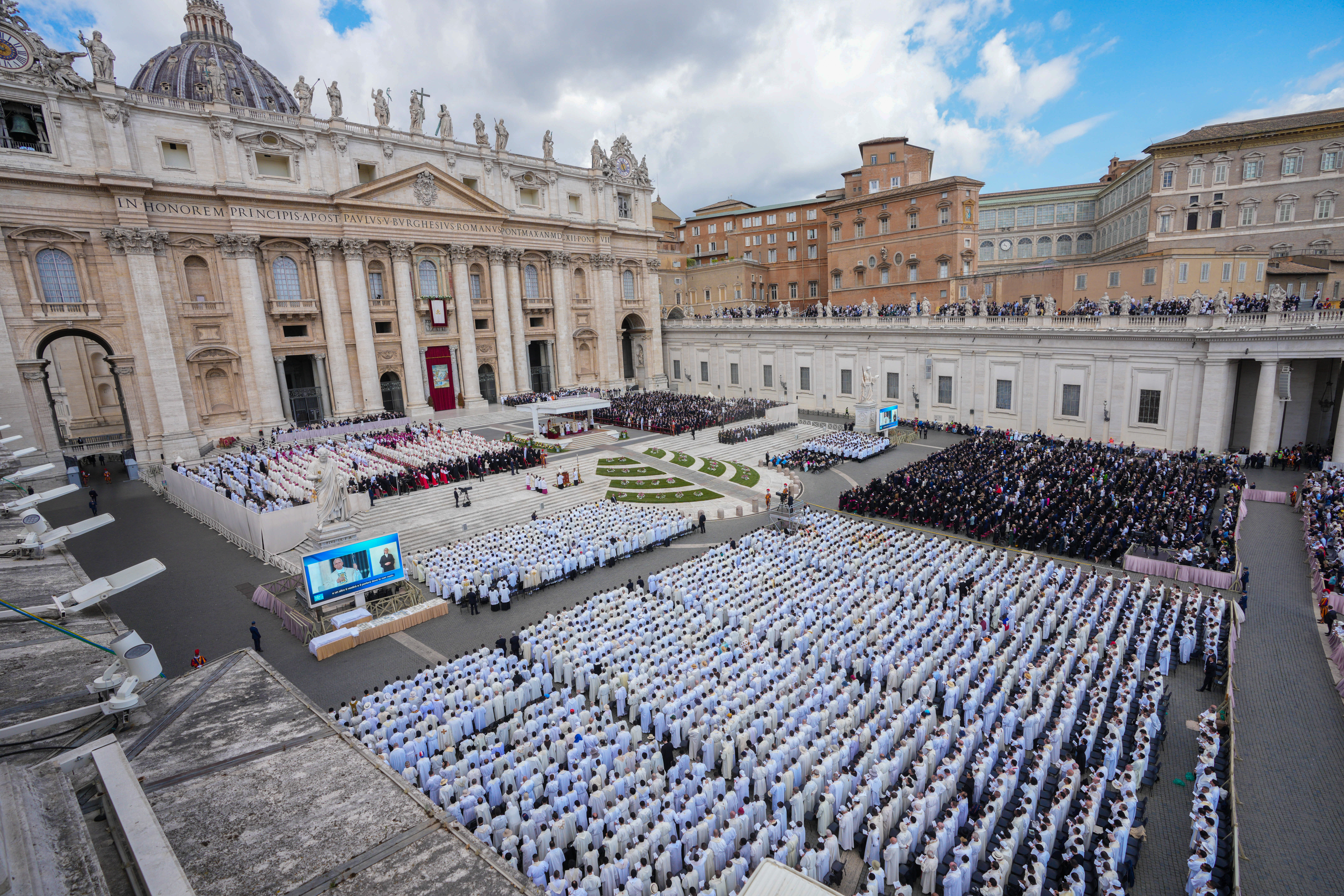
- St. Peter's Square during the liturgy
- Native name: Celebrazione Eucaristica per l'Inizio del Ministero del Vescovo di Roma
- English name: Eucharistic Celebration for the Beginning of the Ministry of the Bishop of Rome
- Date: 18 May 2025
- Time: 10 a.m. (CEST, UTC+02:00)
- Venue: St. Peter's Square
- Location: Vatican City
- Type: Papal inauguration
- Participants: 200,000

On 18 May 2025, Pope Leo XIV celebrated the inauguration Mass of his pontificate, formally known as the "Mass for the Beginning of the Petrine Ministry of the Bishop of Rome". The event was attended by some 200,000 people, including dozens of world leaders and 150 formal delegations. While Leo became the Roman pontiff at the moment of his acceptance in the Sistine Chapel upon being elected in the 2025 papal conclave, the inauguration celebration marked the formal beginning of his ministry as the bishop of Rome. The Mass included the bestowal of the pallium and Ring of the Fisherman, and was followed by meetings with various delegations and world leaders.

== Ceremony ==
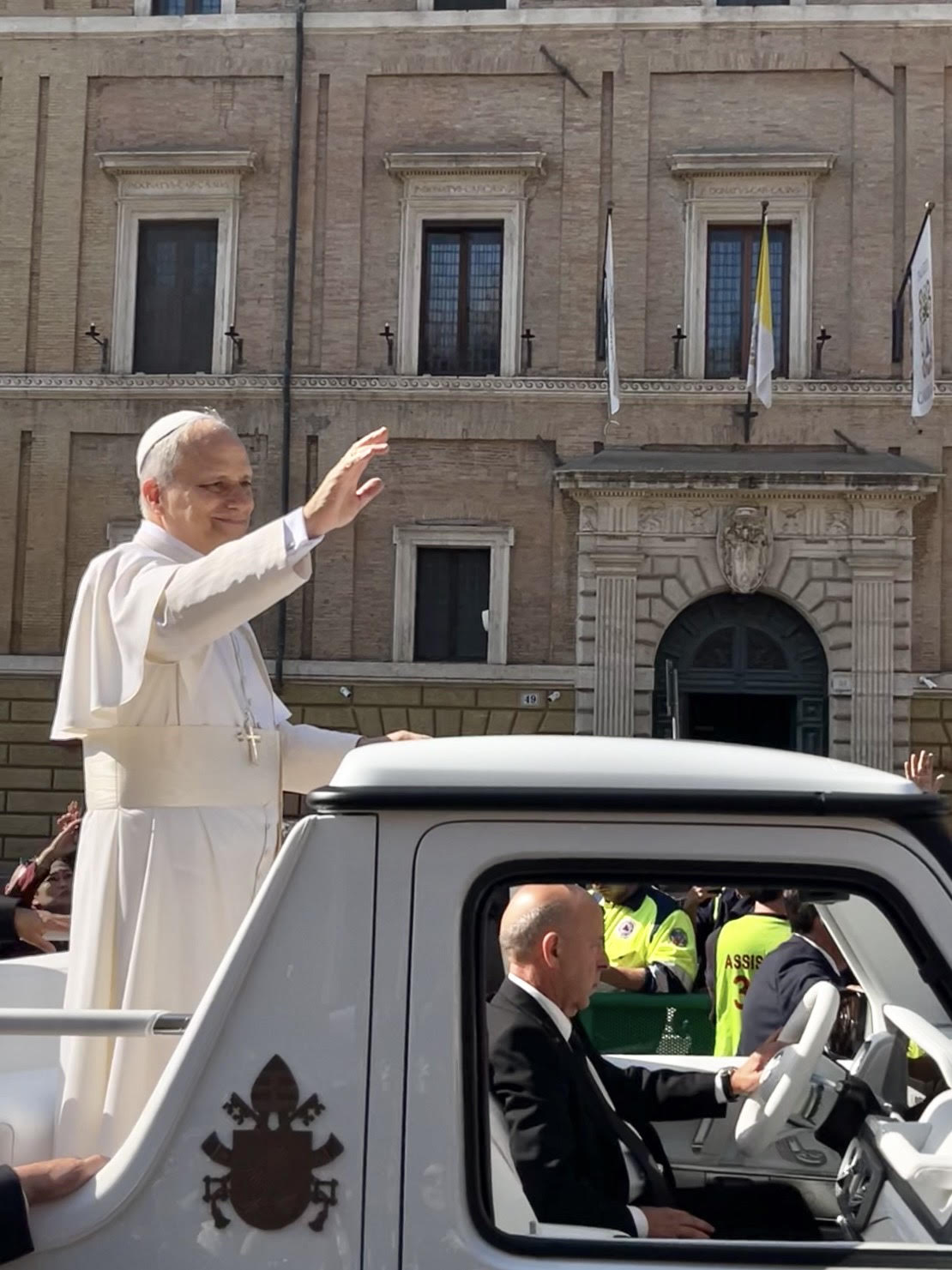
Leo blessing and greeting crowds in the popemobile prior to the ceremony

Pope Leo XIV's coat of arms

Prior to the ceremony, Leo toured St. Peter's Square in the popemobile for the first time, where attendees shouted Viva il Papa! (Long live the Pope), and "USA, USA!" with at least one person chanting "White Sox!", referencing his country of birth and favorite baseball team. Others waved Peruvian or American flags for the countries that claim him as a citizen.

The liturgy formally began at 10 a.m. at Saint Peter's tomb underneath the baldachin of the high altar of St. Peter's Basilica. Surrounded by the patriarchs of the Eastern Catholic Churches, Leo incensed the tomb while the choir sang Tu es Petrus, a motet by Giovanni Pierluigi da Palestrina. Ascending from the grottoes, Leo was joined in procession to the square by two deacons holding the Ring of the Fisherman and the papal pallium, as well as cardinals and bishops. The traditional Laudes Regiae chant was sung during the procession. Leo then conducted the asperges rite, typical on Sundays of Eastertide.

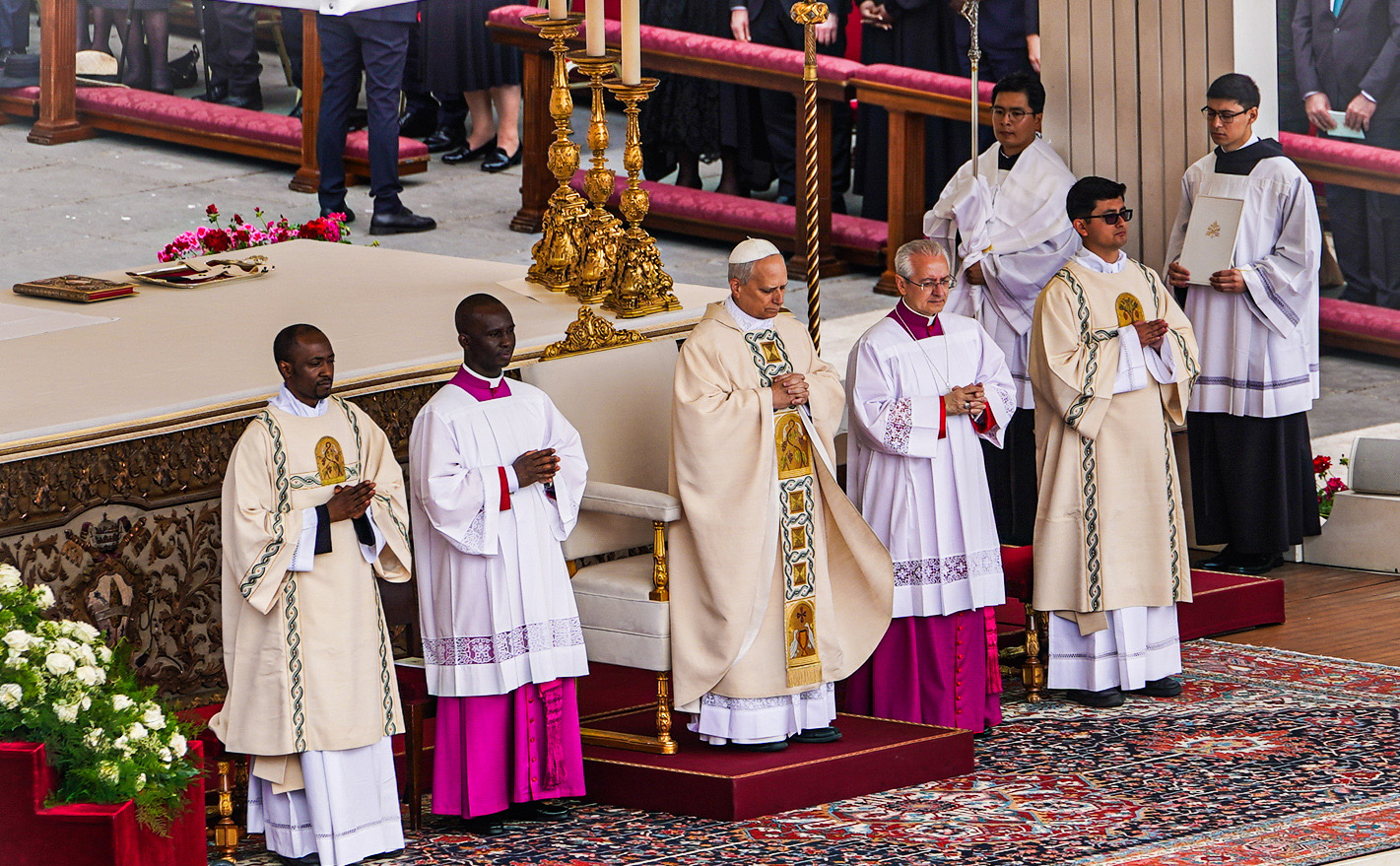
Leo in front of the altar

The first reading, from Acts 4:8-12, was proclaimed in Spanish, referencing Leo's work in the Diocese of Chiclayo. Psalm 118 was sung in Italian, for his new diocese; the second reading, from 1 Peter 5:1-5, 10-11, was proclaimed in English by a faculty member from the Pontifical North American College, referencing Leo's native tongue. The Gospel, John 21:15-19, was chanted in Latin by a deacon from the Diocese of Fort Wayne–South Bend, Indiana, then subsequently chanted in Greek.

Representing the cardinal deacons, Mario Zenari imposed the pallium on Leo's shoulders. Then, representing the cardinal priests, Fridolin Ambongo Besungu conferred a prayer of blessing on the pope. Finally, Luis Antonio Tagle, for cardinal bishops, bestowed the Ring of the Fisherman upon the pontiff; Leo appeared visibly moved by the moment. Following the investment of the insignia, twelve delegates representing the Catholic Church from around the world, including clerics, vowed religious, a married couple, and young adults, were received by Leo. The homily delivered by Leo followed, where he spoke in Italian.

The prayers of the faithful were delivered in Arabic, Chinese, French, Polish, and Portuguese. Tu es pastor ovium was chanted during the offertory. Leo prayed the Roman Canon.

Before the conclusion of Mass, Leo offered some brief remarks, especially offering prayers for the conflicts in Gaza, Myanmar, and Ukraine. The Regina cæli was sung, followed by the final blessing.

Some 30 heads of state, 200 cardinals, and 750 bishops and priests were present. Throughout the ceremony, Leo used the papal ferula commonly used by Pope John Paul II.

=== Formalities ===
Princess Charlene of Monaco, Queen Letizia of Spain, Queen Mathilde of Belgium, and Grand Duchess Maria Teresa of Luxembourg exercised the privilège du blanc extended to Catholic royalty by wearing white to the ceremony.

== Homily ==
Leo began his sermon by thanking those who were present and remembering the emotions of the previous weeks following the death of Pope Francis and subsequent conclave. Recalling the two-fold aspects of ministry entrusted to Saint Peter, love and unity, Leo said he would approach the Church as a brother and servant and with "fear and trembling". Leo expressed a desire for unity and communion in the Church and in the world. He condemned exploitation of Earth's resources and marginalization of the poor. He referenced his papal motto, "in the one Christ, we are one", and exclaimed "Look to Christ! Come closer to him!"

== Subsequent activities ==
After the ceremony, Leo entered St. Peter's basilica and met with 150 delegations in front of the St. Peter's baldachin. Among the delegations was his brother Louis, whom he embraced. After the inauguration, Leo met with Peruvian president Dina Boluarte and Ukrainian president Volodymyr Zelenskyy.

On Monday, 19 May, Leo met with US Vice President JD Vance and Secretary of State Marco Rubio. Vance appeared to give Leo a Chicago Bears jersey with the name "Pope Leo" and number "XIV". Leo also met with Gustavo Petro, president of Colombia; Bartholomew, the ecumenical patriarch of Constantinople; Gerardo Werthein, Minister of Foreign Affairs and Worship of Argentina; and representatives of other churches, ecclesiastical communities, and religions.

In the days following the inauguration, Leo took possession of the other major basilicas, with ceremonies held at the Basilica of Saint Paul Outside the Walls on 20 May, and at the Archbasilica of Saint John Lateran and the Basilica of Santa Maria Maggiore on 25 May, formally installing him as the Bishop of Rome.

== Official delegations ==
=== States ===
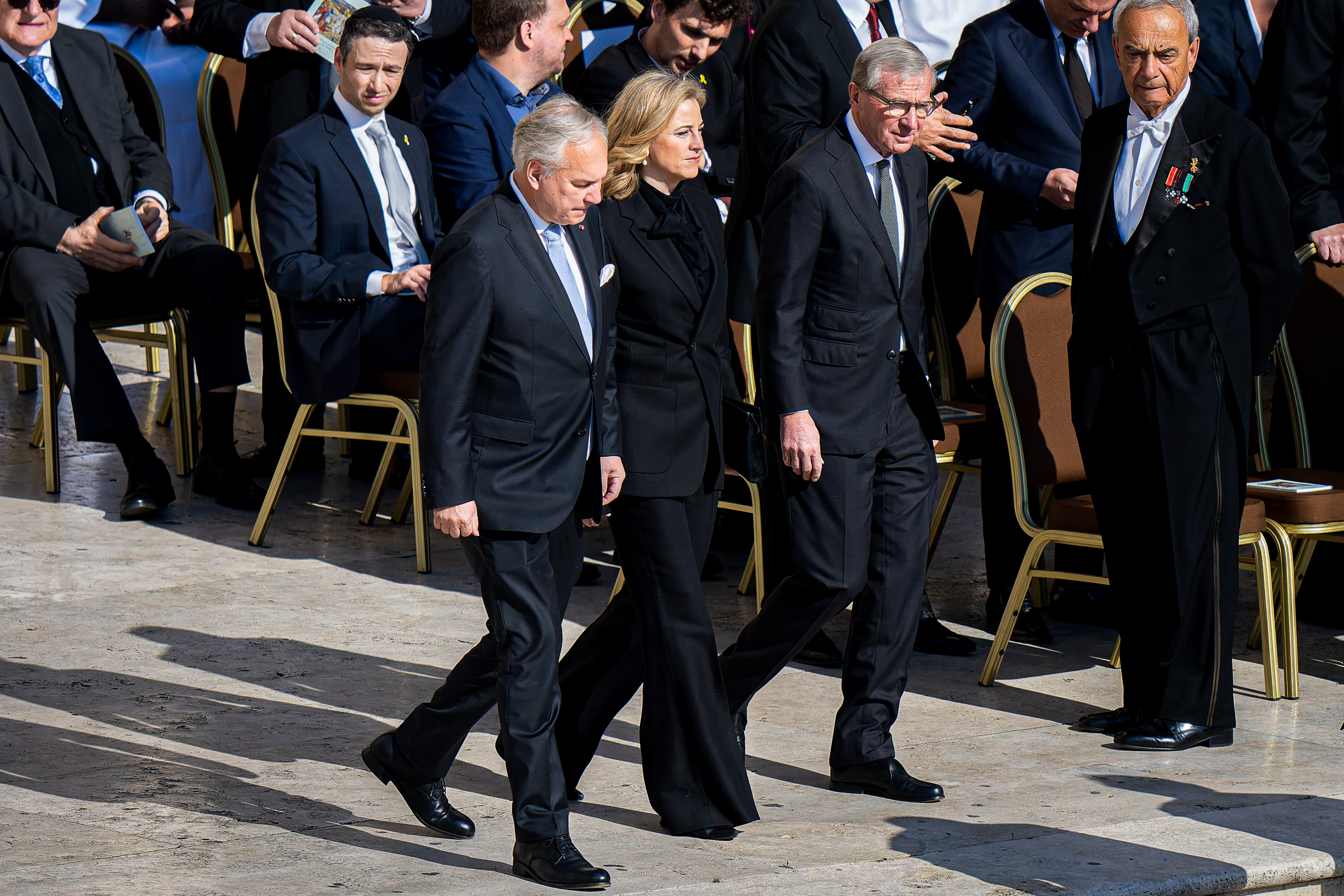
Beate Meinl-Reisinger, Foreign Minister of Austria (center)

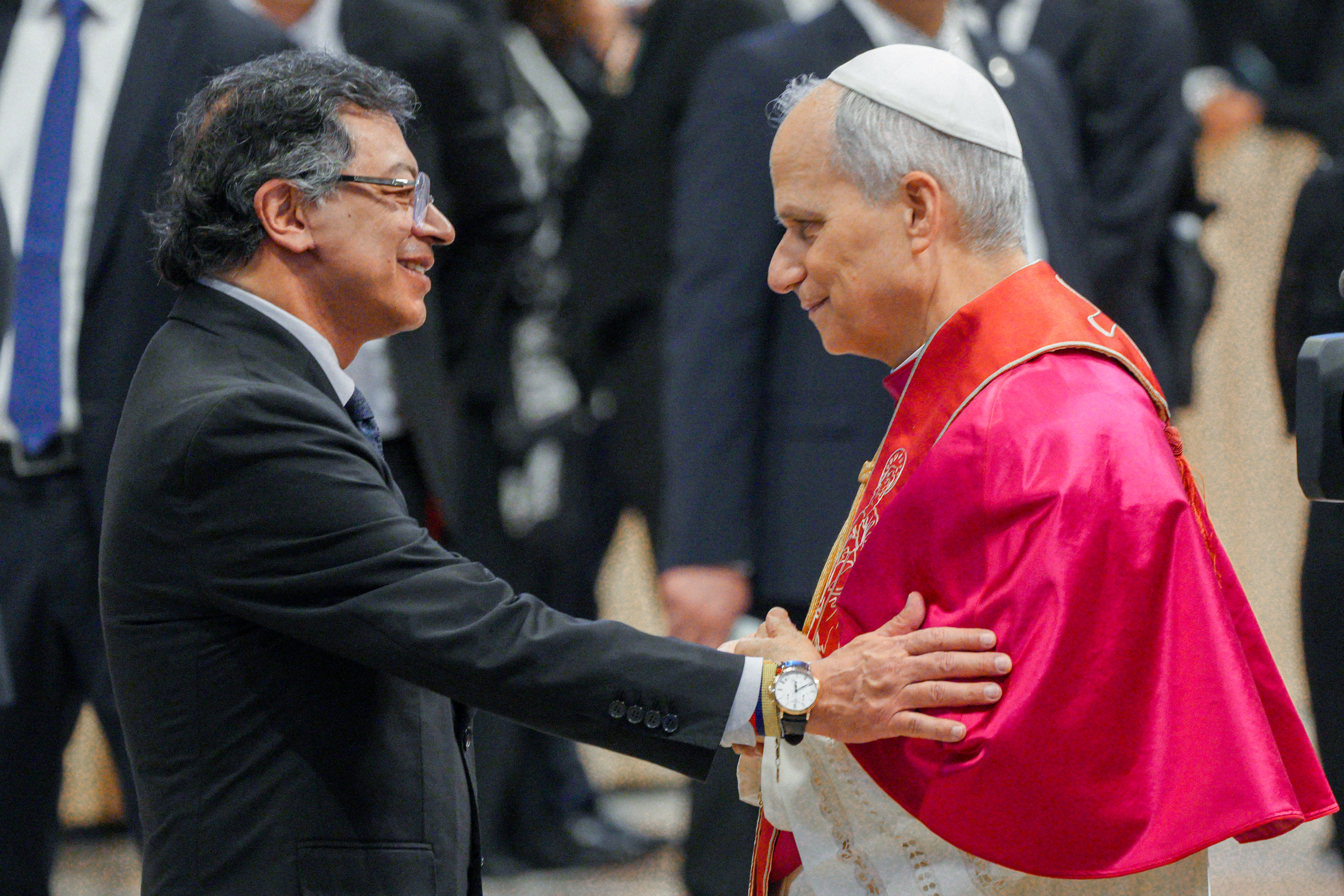
Gustavo Petro, President of Colombia, and Leo

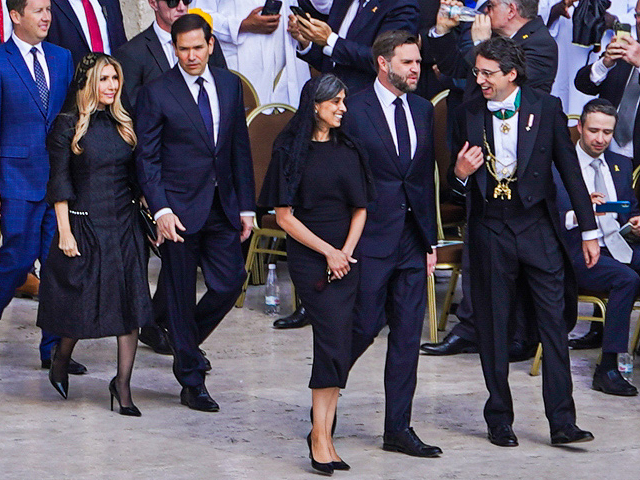
Marco Rubio and JD Vance, Secretary of State and Vice President of the United States, respectively

Country	Official delegation	Ref.
Albania	President Bajram Begaj	
Andorra	Co-Prince Archbishop Joan Enric Vives i Sicília, Representative of the French Co-Prince Patrice Faure, Prime Minister Xavier Espot and General Syndic Carles Ensenyat	
Antigua and Barbuda	Governor–General Rodney Williams	
Argentina	Minister of Foreign Relations Gerardo Werthein	
Armenia	President Vahagn Khachaturyan	
Australia	Prime Minister Anthony Albanese	
Austria	Chancellor Christian Stocker, Minister of Foreign Affairs Beate Meinl-Reisinger	
Azerbaijan	Speaker of the National Assembly Sahiba Gafarova	
(The Bahamas) Bahamas	Ambassador Joseph Curry	
Belarus	Speaker of the House of Representatives Igor Sergeenko	
Belgium	King Philippe of the Belgians and Queen Mathilde, Prime Minister Bart De Wever	
Bolivia	Ambassador Teresa Susana Subieta Serrano	
Bosnia and Herzegovina	Chairwoman of the Council of Ministers Borjana Krišto	
Brazil	Vice President Geraldo Alckmin	
Canada	Prime Minister Mark Carney	
Colombia	President Gustavo Petro	
Croatia	Prime Minister Andrej Plenković, Minister of Foreign Affairs Gordan Grlić-Radman, Speaker of the Parliament Gordan Jandroković	
Cuba	Salvador Valdés Mesa, Vice President of Cuba	
Czech Republic	Minister of Agriculture Marek Výborný	
Ecuador	President Daniel Noboa	
France	Prime Minister François Bayrou	
Gabon	President Brice Oligui Nguema	
Germany	Chancellor Friedrich Merz	
(Georgia (country)) Georgia	President Mikheil Kavelashvili	
Hungary	President Tamás Sulyok	
India	Deputy Chairman of Rajya Sabha Harivansh Narayan Singh	
(Republic of Ireland) Ireland	President Michael D. Higgins	
Israel	President Isaac Herzog	
Italy	President Sergio Mattarella, Prime Minister Giorgia Meloni, Minister of Foreign Affairs Antonio Tajani, President of the Senate Ignazio La Russa, President of the Chamber of Deputies Lorenzo Fontana and President of the Constitutional Court Giovanni Amoroso	
Japan	Former prime minister Taro Aso	
Kosovo	President Vjosa Osmani	
Latvia	Prime Minister Evika Siliņa	
Lebanon	President Joseph Aoun	
Liechtenstein	Hereditary Prince Alois and Hereditary Princess Sophie, Prime Minister Brigitte Haas	
Lithuania	President Gitanas Nauseda	
Luxembourg	Grand Duke Henri and Grand Duchess Maria Teresa, Prime Minister Luc Frieden	
Malta	Prime Minister Robert Abela	
Mexico	Secretary of the Interior Rosa Icela Rodríguez	
Monaco	Prince Albert II and Princess Charlene	
Morocco	Prime Minister Aziz Akhannouch	
Montenegro	Prime Minister Milojko Spajić	
Mozambique	Prime Minister Maria Benvinda Levy	
Netherlands	Queen Maxima and Prime Minister Dick Schoof	
Nigeria	President Bola Tinubu	
Panama	Javier Martinez-Acha, Minister of Foreign Affairs of Panama	
Paraguay	President Santiago Peña and President of the Chamber of Deputies Raúl Latorre	
Peru	President Dina Boluarte	
Poland	President Andrzej Duda	
Portugal	President Marcelo Rebelo de Sousa	
Russia	Ambassador to the Vatican Ivan Soltanovsky	
Saint Lucia	Gilbert Chaguory, Ambassador of St. Lucia to the Holy See Saint Vincent and the Grenadines Honorary Consul Dr. Ruediger Ackermann	
San Marino	Captains Regent Denise Bronzetti and Italo Righi	
Saudi Arabia	Minister of Foreign Affairs Adel al-Jubeir and Prince Faisal bin Sattam Al Saud	
Serbia	Prime Minister Đuro Macut	
Slovakia	President Peter Pellegrini	
Slovenia	Prime Minister Robert Golob	
Spain	King Felipe VI and Queen Letizia, Deputy Prime Ministers María Jesús Montero and Yolanda Díaz, Minister of the Presidency and Justice Félix Bolaños and Leader of the Opposition Alberto Núñez Feijóo	
Sweden	Crown Princess Victoria, Minister for Social Affairs and Public Health Jakob Forssmed and Archbishop of Uppsala Martin Modéus	
Switzerland	President Karin Keller-Sutter	
Taiwan (Republic of China)	Former Vice President Chen Chien-jen	
Togo	President Faure Gnassingbé	
Ukraine	President Volodymyr Zelenskyy	
United Kingdom	Prince Edward, Duke of Edinburgh (representing the King of the United Kingdom and the Supreme Governor of the Church of England), Foreign Secretary David Lammy and Deputy Prime Minister Angela Rayner	
United States of America	Vice President JD Vance and Secretary of State Marco Rubio (and spouses)	
Uzbekistan	Speaker of the Legislative Chamber Nuriddinjon Ismailov	

=== Other entities ===
Subject of International Law	Official delegation	Ref.
European Commission	Ursula von der Leyen	
Sovereign Military Order of Malta	Prince and Grand Master John T. Dunlap	

=== Religious figures ===
==== Christian communities ====
Community	Official delegation	Ref.
Apostolic Churches
Armenian Apostolic Church	Bishop Koryoun Baghdasaryan	
Coptic Orthodox Church	Bishop Barnaba of Turin and Rome, Bishop Damian of Northern Germany, Bishop Marc of Paris and Northern France, and Bishop Kyrillos of Los Angeles	
Ecumenical Patriarchate of Constantinople	Ecumenical Patriarch Bartholomew I of Constantinople	
Union of Utrecht of the Old Catholic Churches	Archbishop of Utrecht Bernd Wallet and Frank Bangerter, Bishop of Switzerland	
Protestant communities
Anglican Church	Archbishop Leonard Dawea, Archbishop Stephen Cottrell, Presiding Bishop Sean Rowe and others	
Lutheran World Federation	Anne Burghardt	
World Council of Churches	Heinrich Bedford-Strohm and Jerry Pillay	
World Communion of Reformed Churches		
World Methodist Council	Debra Padgett Wallace and Joshua Rathnam	
Other
The Church of Jesus Christ of Latter-day Saints	Elder Matthew S. Holland	

==== Other religions ====
Jewish, Muslim, Hindu, Buddhist, Sikh, Zoroastrian and Jainist leaders were present.

Community	Official delegation	Ref.
Judaism	Rabbi Noam Marans, Director of Interreligious Affairs of the American Jewish Committee	
