= Inauguration of Pope John Paul I =

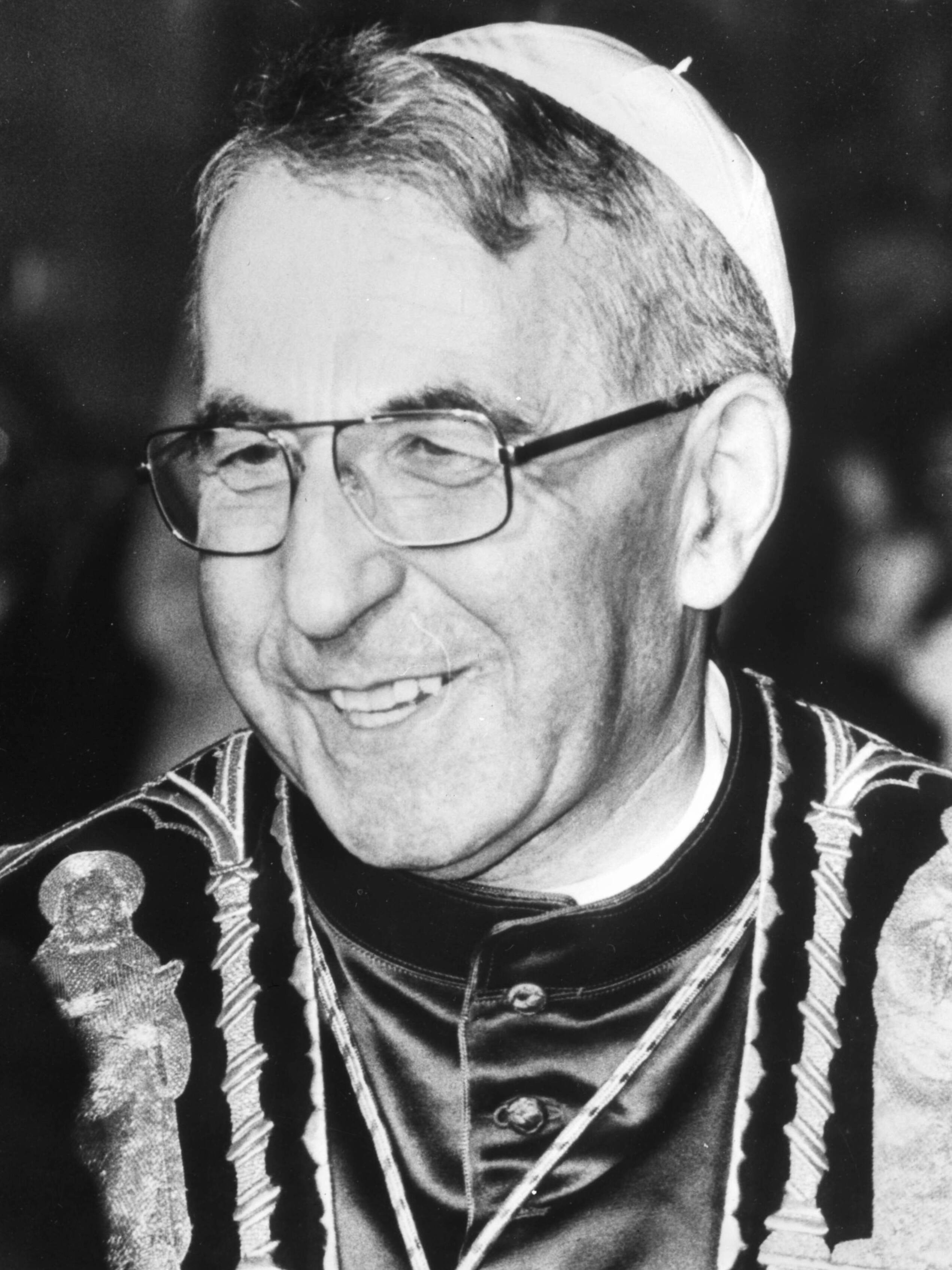
- Pope John Paul I in 1978
- Date: 3 September 1978
- Time: 6 p.m. (CET, UTC+01:00)
- Venue: St. Peter's Square
- Location: Vatican City
- Type: Papal inauguration
- Participants: 120,000–250,000

The papal inauguration of Pope John Paul I took place on 3 September 1978. Pope John Paul I was the first pope to eschew the papal tiara and opt for a simple inauguration rather than an elaborate papal coronation. Representatives from many countries and denominations, including American Vice President Walter Mondale, were present. The presence of president of Argentina Jorge Rafael Videla sparked protests.

== Preparation ==
In a break from traditional practice, Pope John Paul I chose not to be crowned with a papal tiara, opting for a more simple mitre. As such, the ceremony was not called a coronation, but an inauguration. In a similar manner the papal throne was not covered with its traditional canopy. He also set aside the part of the ceremony wherein two Franciscans burn pieces of flax and recite Sic transit gloria mundi, or "Thus does the world's glory pass".

The evening prior to the ceremony, Pope John Paul I met with representatives of the Anglican, Presbyterian, and Armenian Protestant churches, as well as representatives of the Ecumenical Patriarchate of Constantinople, the French Armenian Church, and Union of Utrecht Old Catholic churches. Philip Potter of the World Council of Churches was also present.

== Ceremony ==
The ceremony began at 6 p.m. with prayers at Saint Peter's tomb underneath the baldachin of the high altar of St. Peter's Basilica. He then processed behind 104 cardinals out to St. Peter's Square, as the choir sang Veni, Creator Spiritus. Cardinal Pericle Felici placed the pallium on the shoulders of the pontiff. (Note: No sources seem to indicate that the Ring of the Fisherman was imposed at this ceremony.) Each cardinal then came forward individually to profess obedience and kiss the pope's ring.

Readings and prayers for the Mass were done in French, Spanish, German, and English, with the primary language of the Mass being Latin. The pope gave his homily in Latin, Italian, and French. His homily particularly focused on Mary, whom John Paul stated particularly guided his life as a boy, seminarian, priest, and bishop.

During the Mass, John Paul I personally distributed communion to his brother Eduardo and sister Antonia, and about 40 others.

At the end of the ceremony, which took two hours and fifteen minutes, the pope imparted the traditional Urbi et Orbi blessing.

== Attendees ==
Around 250,000 people were in attendance in St. Peter's Square. American Vice President Walter Mondale attended the inauguration with his wife Joan and son William. The American delegation also included Senator Claiborne Pell, and congressmen Peter Rodino Jr., Clement Zablocki, and Mario Biaggi. Mayors George Moscone of San Francisco, Michael A. Bilandic of Chicago, and governor Brendan Byrne of New Jersey were also present. Archbishop John Roach, vice president of the National Conference of Catholic Bishops, represented the American episcopate.

President Jorge Rafael Videla of Argentina, President Elias Sarkis of Lebanon, President Valéry Giscard d'Estaing of France, Prime Minister Pierre Trudeau of Canada, attended. Royal dignitaries included King Juan Carlos I and Queen Sofía of Spain, and Prince Rainier III and Princess Grace of Monaco. Miles Fitzalan-Howard, Duke of Norfolk and a Catholic, represented Queen Elizabeth II.

Representatives were present from the Russian Orthodox Church as well as other Christian denominations, including the National Council of Churches

=== Terrorism ===
Some 282 Argentine demonstrators protested the presence of their president, Jorge Videla. An estimated security force of 10,000 were present, including snipers on nearby roofs. A sign stating "Videla Hangman" was floated over St. Peter's Square with balloons. Firebombs from protestors destroyed five cars in areas near St. Peter's Square, and one diplomatic car was attacked. 200 demonstrators were detained by police. Armored vehicles prevented demonstrators from entering the square.

Around 50 soldiers and half a dozen jeeps were dedicated to guarding Walter Mondale. After the ceremony, a bomb exploded at the residence of Cardinal Ugo Poletti, who was at the time Vicar General of Rome. There were no injuries.
