= Papal ferula =

Staff used by the pope

Ferula
Pastoral staff

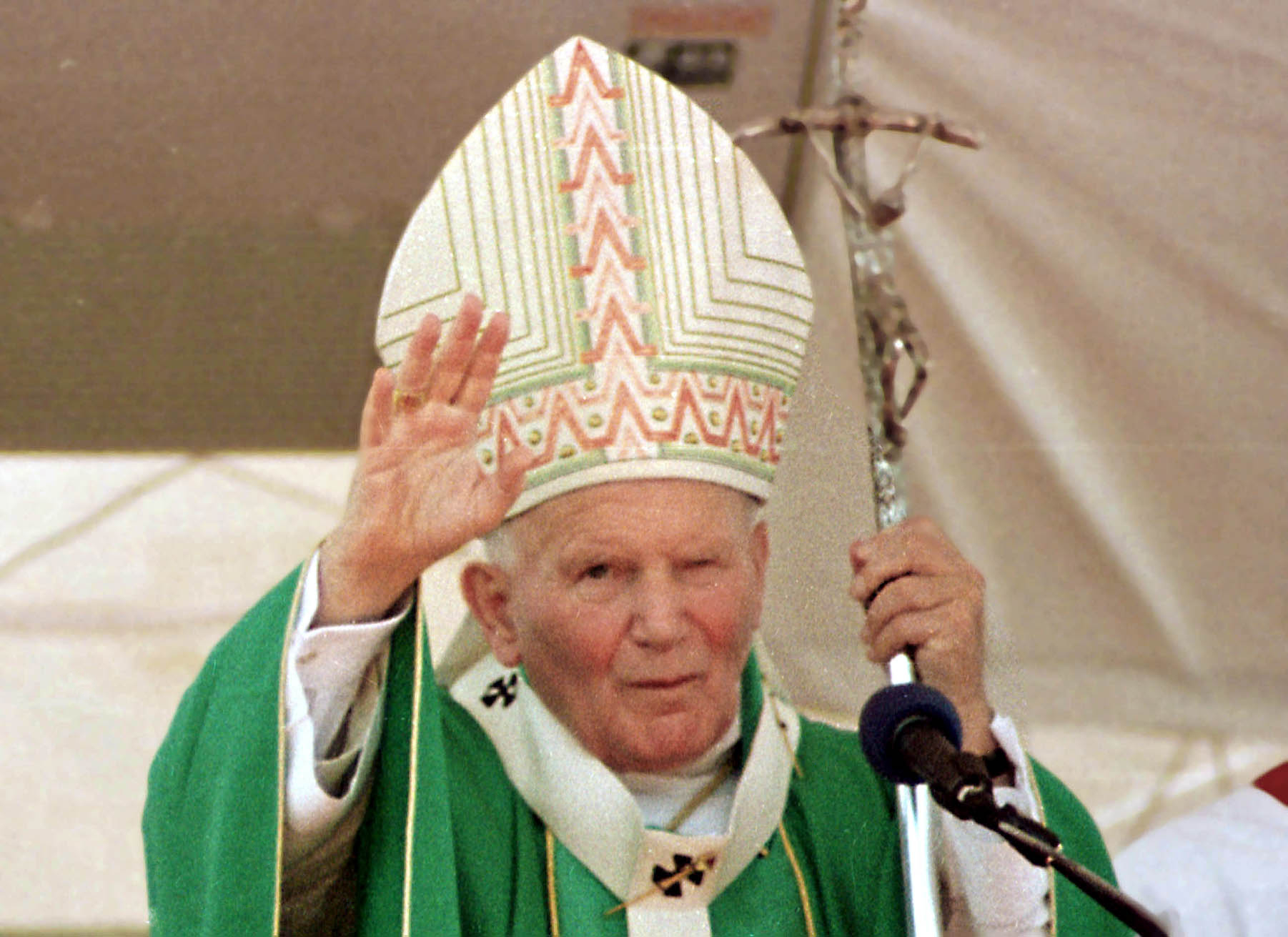
Pope John Paul II holding the ferula of Pope Paul VI on 5 October 1997

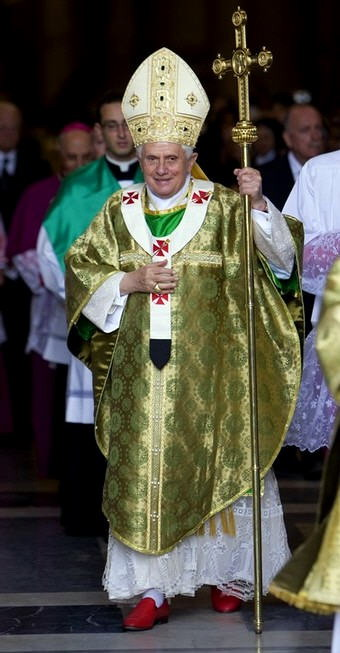
Pope Benedict XVI holding the ferula of Pope Pius IX on 5 October 2008

The papal ferula (/ˈfɛrələ/; Latin ferula, 'rod') is the pastoral staff used in the Catholic Church by the pope. It is a rod with a knob on top surmounted by a cross. It differs from a crosier, the staff carried by other Latin Church bishops, which is curved or bent at the top in the style of a shepherd's crook.

== History ==
=== Early usage and dispute ===
Traditionally, the popes did not use any ferula, crosier, or pastoral staff as part of the papal liturgy. The use of a staff is not mentioned in descriptions of Papal Masses in the Ordines Romani. In the early days of the Church a pope would sometimes carry a crosier, but this practice disappeared by the time of Pope Innocent III. He noted in his De Sacro altaris mysterio ("Concerning the Sacred Mystery of the Altar", I, 62): "The Roman Pontiff does not use the shepherd's staff." The reason was that a crosier is often given by the metropolitan archbishop (or another bishop) to a newly elected bishop during his investiture or episcopal ordination. In contrast, the pope does not receive investiture from another bishop and is invested with the pallium during his coronation or the modern inauguration.

=== Re-adoption ===
During the High Middle Ages, the popes once again began using a staff known as a ferula as part of their insignia. It signified temporal power and governance, which included "the power to mete out punishment and impose penances". The actual form of the staves from this period is not well known, but they were most probably staffs topped with a knob and surmounted by a single-barred cross. The staff was not a common liturgical item, and its use was limited to a few extraordinary celebrations proper to the pope, such as the opening of the Holy Door and the consecration of churches, during which the pope "took hold of the staff to knock on the door three times and to trace the Greek and Latin letters on the floor of the church".

=== Modern usage ===
The pastoral staff carried by the popes since Pope Paul VI is a contemporary single-barred crucifix, designed by the Italian artist Lello Scorzelli in 1963 and carried and used in the same manner as a bishop uses his crosier. Paul VI had actually used three other ferulas, similar in style, with the other versions having a cross bar which was straight, or bent upward. Scorzelli's well-known version has the cross bar curving downward, much like the paterissa carried by bishops of the Eastern Catholic Churches. Paul VI first used this staff on 8 December 1965, at the closing of the Second Vatican Council. The Scorzelli staff was the one retained by his successors, starting with Pope John Paul I. This ferula design is often associated with Pope John Paul II and is one of his identifying attributes in religious paintings and statuary.

On 25 March 1983, Pope John Paul II used the ferula of Leo XIII with three horizontal bars in the opening of the Holy Door during the Jubilee, the Holy Year of the Redemption. In 1990, Scorzelli made a replica of the Paul VI ferula for John Paul II, which was lighter than the previous one. Pope Benedict XVI would continue to use this ferula on the first three years of his pontificate.

On 16 March 2008, at the Palm Sunday celebrations in Saint Peter's Square, Pope Benedict XVI used the ferula of Pius IX. This staff was used until 28 November 2009 at the First Vespers for Advent. A new ferula was given to Pope Benedict XVI as a gift of the Circolo San Pietro and, according to Monsignor Guido Marini, the Master of Apostolic Ceremonies and head of the Office for the Liturgical Celebrations of the Supreme Pontiff, it "can be considered to all intents and purposes the pastoral staff of Benedict XVI".

Pope Francis continued to use the ferula of Benedict XVI at the beginning of his pontificate. On 7 April 2013, at the Mass for the Possession of the Chair of the Bishop of Rome in the Archbasilica of Saint John Lateran in Rome, Francis returned to using the 1965 ferula of Paul VI. Along with the ferula of Pope Paul VI and Pope Benedict XVI, Pope Francis would also make use of ferula or another crosier made for him during his pastoral visits inside and outside Italy.

Pope Leo XIV used the ferula originally made for Benedict XVI during his first public Mass in the Sistine Chapel on 9 May 2025. At his inauguration Mass and other subsequent Masses he would preside until 1 January 2026, Leo used the ferula of Paul VI.

On 6 January 2026, Pope Leo began using a new ferula for the closing of the 2025 Jubilee, created by the Savi brothers. The Office for the Liturgical Celebrations of the Supreme Pontiff describes the new ferula as a representation of both the Passion and the Resurrection of Jesus, depicted by a Cross resembling the ferula made by Scorzelli, but has a figure of the Risen Christ, instead of being nailed to the cross. Pope Leo's papal motto is engraved on the knob below the crucifix of the ferula.

Pope Leo used a different variant of the Savi brothers' papal ferula during his pastoral trips to Algeria, Cameroon, Angola, and Equatorial Guinea.
