= Papal inauguration =

Investiture ceremony of the head of the Catholic Church

Papal inauguration is a liturgical service of the Catholic Church within Mass celebrated in the Roman Rite but with elements of Byzantine Rite for the ecclesiastical investiture of a pope. Since the inauguration of Pope John Paul I, it has not included the 820-year-old (1143–1963) papal coronation ceremony.

It was in the 11th century that the inauguration took the form of a coronation. Along with other ceremonies used at papal inaugurations, a coronation became part of a pope's inauguration ritual from the time of Pope Nicholas II (1059–1061) until 1963. Pope Paul VI, the last pope to be crowned or to use a papal tiara, abandoned the use of his tiara in a ceremony at the end of the second period of the Second Vatican Council.

More than twenty tiaras are held in the Vatican. That of Paul VI is in the crypt of the Basilica of the National Shrine of the Immaculate Conception in Washington, D.C.

A small one is still used to symbolically crown a statue of Saint Peter on his feast day every year. The first pope for more than eight centuries to inaugurate his pontificate without a coronation was Pope John Paul I.

== Abandonment of the coronation ==
Pope Paul VI, the last pope to be crowned or to use a papal tiara, abandoned the use of his tiara in a ceremony at the end of the second period of the Second Vatican Council, and announced that it would be sold and the money obtained would be given to charity; it was in fact bought by Catholics in the United States and is now kept in the Basilica of the National Shrine of the Immaculate Conception in Washington, D.C.

Though Paul VI decided not to wear a tiara, his 1975 apostolic constitution Romano Pontifici eligendo continued to envisage a "coronation" ceremony for his successors. However, Pope John Paul I, elected in the August 1978 conclave, wanted a simpler ceremony, and commissioned Virgilio Noè, the Papal Master of Ceremonies, to design the inauguration ceremony that was used. Taking place in the context of a "Mass of Inauguration", the high point of the ceremony was the placing of the pallium on the new pope's shoulders, and the receiving of the obedience of the cardinals.

His successor, Pope John Paul II, followed suit, maintaining the changes made by his predecessor, though with additions. The Mass of inauguration was celebrated, not in the evening, as for John Paul I, but in the morning. Referring in his inauguration homily to coronation with the papal tiara, John Paul II said: "This is not the time to return to a ceremony and an object considered, wrongly, to be a symbol of the temporal power of the Popes."

In his 1996 apostolic constitution Universi Dominici gregis, John Paul II laid down that a "solemn ceremony of the inauguration of a pontificate" should take place, but did not specify its form, which he left to each pope to decide.

== Modern papal inauguration ==
Five modern popes have now used an inauguration ceremony without coronation: Pope John Paul I, Pope John Paul II (both in 1978), Pope Benedict XVI (2005), Pope Francis (2013), and Pope Leo XIV (2025).

The modern papal inauguration, developed from the form used for John Paul I, takes place during Mass (usually in Saint Peter's Square) and involves the formal bestowal of the pallium, the symbol of the pope's universal jurisdiction, on the newly elected pope by the senior Cardinal Deacon.

Pope Benedict XVI maintained those changes and also shortened, as explained below, the ceremony of homage previously paid at a papal inauguration by each cardinal individually, repeating the "act of homage and obedience" made in the conclave to the new pope before the announcement of his election to the people.

The ceremony does not include the alleged Papal Oath that some traditionalist Catholics claim, without evidence, to have been sworn by the popes before John Paul I. They criticise its absence, and some sedevacantist groups refuse to accept the legitimacy of the modern popes due to the absence of both the alleged oath and the symbolic tiara.

== Inauguration of Benedict XVI ==
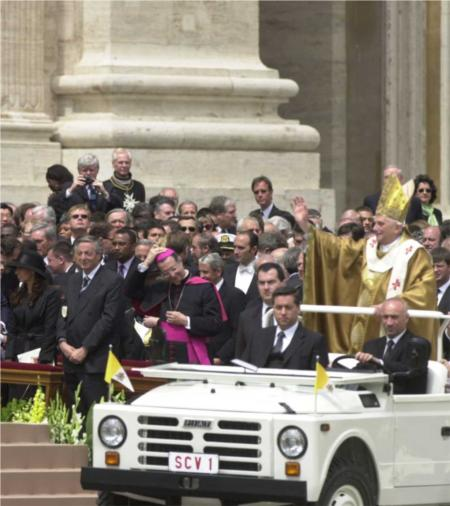
Pope Benedict XVI's first trip in the popemobile at his inauguration

Pope Benedict XVI celebrated his inauguration on 24 April 2005 after being elected on 19 April 2005 having approved new procedures for the papal inauguration previously on 20 April 2005 the day after his election. The ceremony began with the pope and the cardinals kneeling at the Tomb of Saint Peter beneath the high altar of Saint Peter's Basilica—the popes are, according to Catholic dogma, the successors of Saint Peter, the first head of the Church in Rome—to give him homage, and ask his prayers. Pope Benedict said, "I leave from where the Apostle arrived." The pope and the cardinals then went in procession to Saint Peter's Square for the inauguration Mass, while the Laudes Regiæ was chanted, asking help for the new pope.

=== Receiving the pallium and the Piscatory Ring ===
The pope received the pallium and the Ring of the Fisherman. Cardinal Jorge Medina, the cardinal protodeacon, formally bestowed the pallium on the pope. The pallium used was different from that of previous popes: it was an earlier form practically identical to the ancient omophorion (still used to this day by Eastern bishops); wider than the standard archiepiscopal pallium, though not as wide as the modern omophorion; 2.4 metres (2.6 yd) long, made of wool with black silk tips. It had five embroidered red silk crosses instead of the six black ones of the normal archbishops' pallium. Pope Benedict later in his pontificate would use a pallium similar to that of his immediate predecessors, but with a longer, wider cut and six red crosses.

After the pallium was bestowed and before the Ring of the Fisherman was presented, Cardinal Stephen Kim Sou-hwan, as the senior cardinal priest, pronounced the formal prayer for the new pope.

Cardinal Angelo Sodano, as the vice-dean of the college of cardinals and secretary of state, formally presented the Ring of the Fisherman to the pope. As the pope himself was the dean, he put on the ring by himself.

=== Act of homage ===
Instead of having each of the more than one hundred cardinals kneel before the pope individually to do him homage, twelve people, lay as well as clerical, did so: Senior Cardinal Bishop Angelo Sodano, Cardinal Protopriest Stephen Kim Sou-hwan, Cardinal Protodeacon Jorge Medina, Bishop Andrea Erba of Benedict's former suburbicarian diocese of Velletri-Segni, Father Enrico Pomili from Benedict's former titular church Santa Maria Consolatrice al Tiburtino when he was a cardinal priest, a deacon, a religious brother, a Benedictine nun, a married couple from Korea, a young woman from Sri Lanka, and a young man from the Democratic Republic of the Congo, each of whom had been recently confirmed.

=== After the ceremony ===
After Mass, Pope Benedict greeted inside St. Peter's Basilica, before the main altar, various delegations present for his inauguration. In the days following, he visited the other major basilicas of Rome. On 25 April 2005, the day after his inauguration at St. Peter's, he paid homage to the other founder of the church of Rome by visiting St. Paul Outside the Walls. On 7 May, he took possession of the Archbasilica of St. John Lateran—his cathedral church. Later that evening he venerated the Salus Populi Romani icon of Mary in the Basilica of Saint Mary Major.

== Inauguration of Francis ==
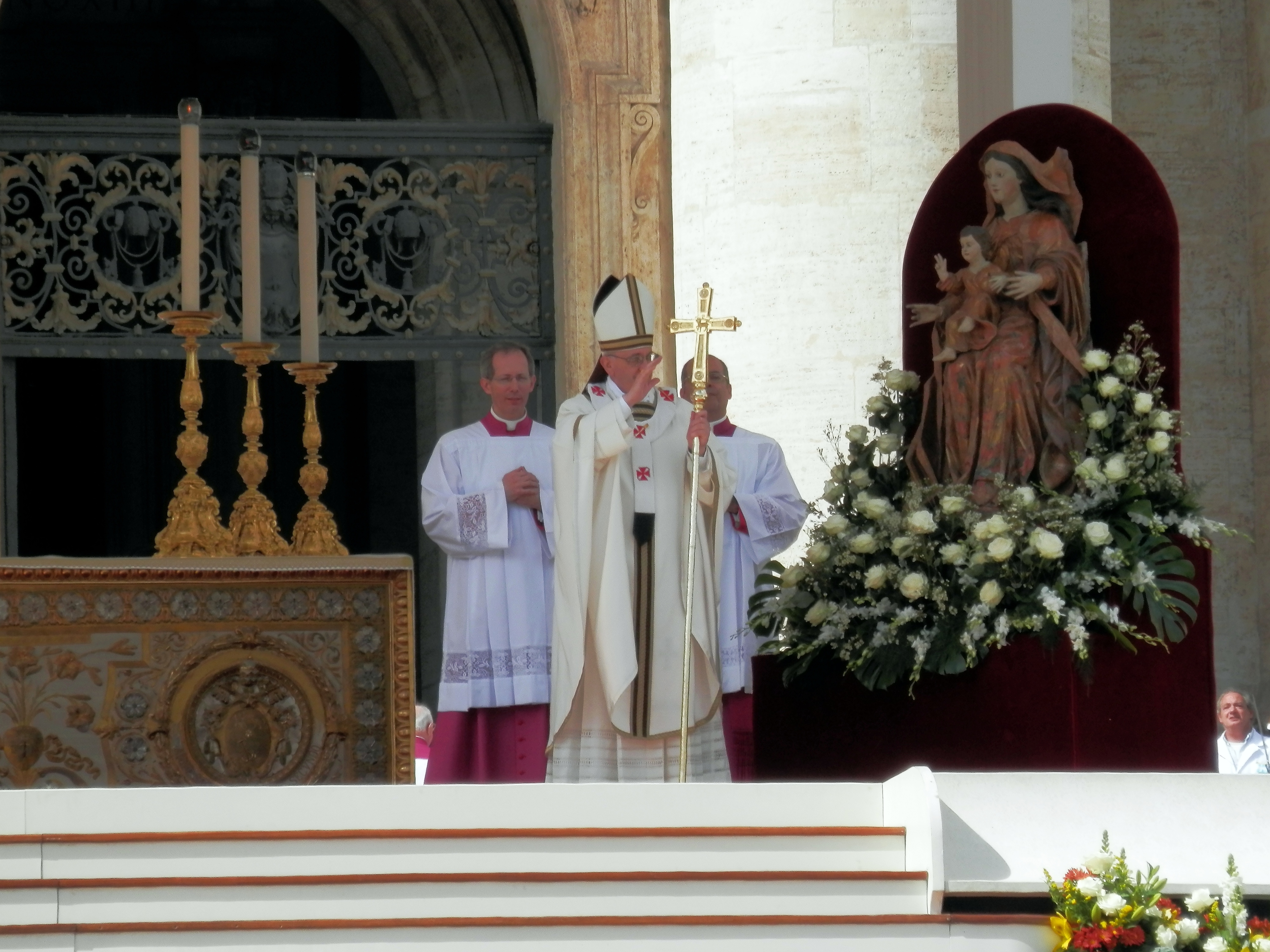
Inauguration of Pope Francis

Pope Francis celebrated his papal inauguration on 19 March 2013, the Solemnity of Saint Joseph, following his election on 13 March 2013. He used a mitre he has had since he first became a bishop. His chasuble matched the mitre. He used the same pastoral staff that Benedict XVI used. Pope Francis kept the chants and liturgical actions simple. The fact that he himself did not chant the liturgy was attributed by Cardinal Timothy Dolan to his having only one lung.

Francis first descended to the tomb of St. Peter in St. Peter's Basilica where, along with the patriarchs and major-archbishops of the Eastern Catholic Churches, he prayed at the tomb. The pallium and the Ring of the Fisherman were then carried up from the tomb by two deacons to be borne in procession. The pope and the Eastern Catholic patriarchs and major-archbishops returned to the main floor of the basilica and processed along with the other cardinals, bishops and other clergy to the square, chanting the Laudes Regiae.

Cardinal Protodeacon Jean-Louis Tauran bestowed the pallium on the pope. The most senior elector from the cardinal-priests present, Godfried Daneels, read aloud the formal prayer for the new pope before the Ring of the Fisherman was presented. (Note: The senior cardinal-priest or protopriest reads the prayer, but in the absence of Senior Cardinal-Priest Paulo Evaristo Arns the next senior, Godfried Danneels, read it.) Angelo Sodano, Dean of the College of Cardinals, presented him with his Fisherman's Ring of gold-plated silver, unlike his predecessors', which were of gold. Six cardinals, two of each order, then professed their obedience to Pope Francis on behalf of the College of Cardinals. The six cardinals were Giovanni Battista Re and Tarcisio Bertone representing the cardinal-bishops; Joachim Meisner and Jozef Tomko representing the cardinal-priests; and Renato Raffaele Martino and Francesco Marchisano representing the cardinal-deacons.

== Inauguration of Leo XIV ==
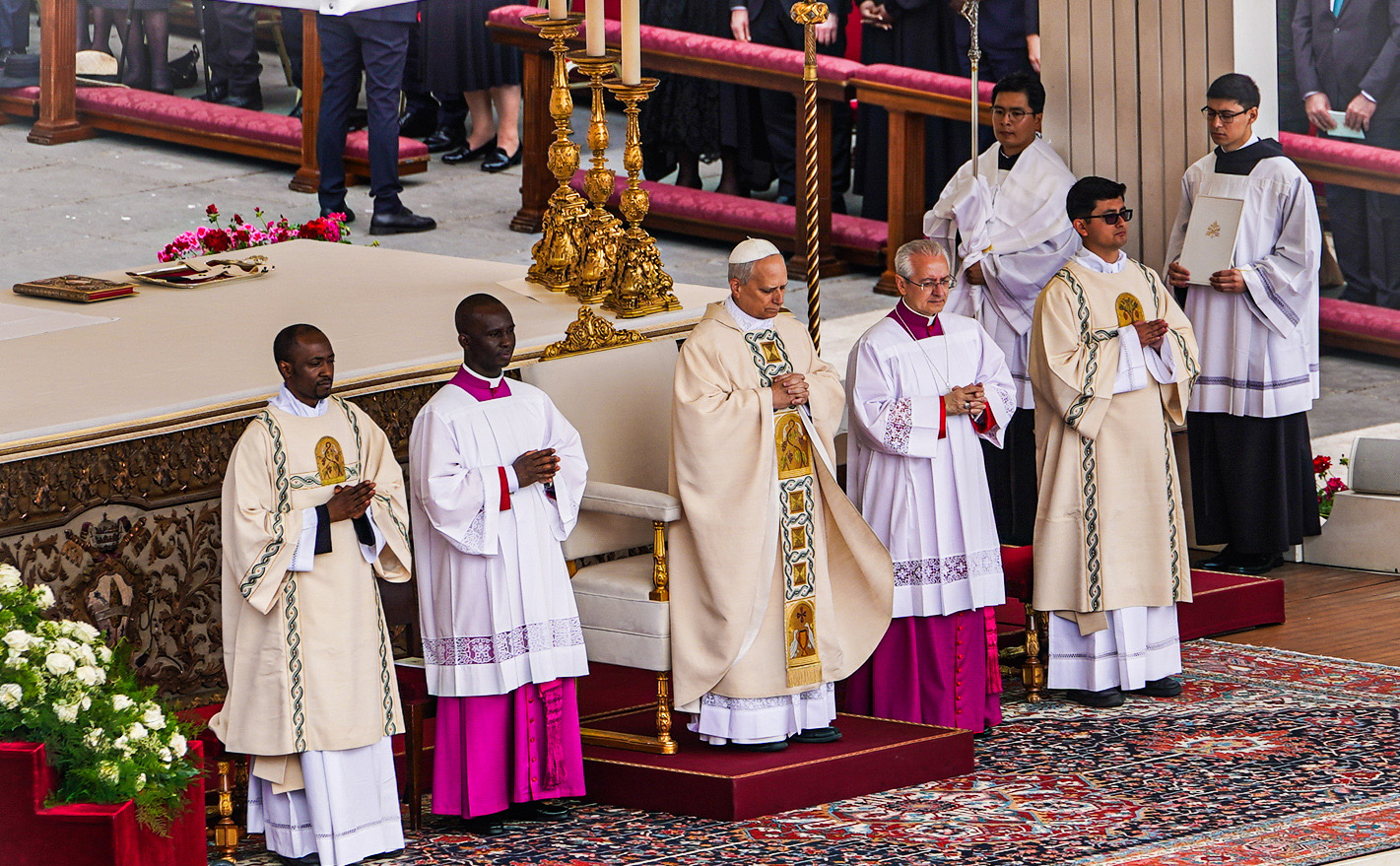
Inauguration of Pope Leo XIV

Pope Leo XIV held his inauguration on 18 May 2025, the fifth Sunday of Easter, and on the 105th birth anniversary of Pope St. John Paul II. He used a white chasuble frequently used by his three predecessors – John Paul II, Benedict XVI and Francis – and carried the Papal ferula, designed by Lello Scorzelli, used since the time of Pope Paul VI. The Office for the Liturgical Celebrations of the Supreme Pontiff released the booklet for the celebration on May 14, 2025, which used the proper prayers and readings for the Inauguration of the Petrine Ministry, instead of that Sunday’s readings. The same office provided explanation for the different elements surrounding a Papal Inauguration.

The pope greeted the crowds at St. Peter's Square, approximately an hour before the beginning of the Mass, going as far as the Via della Conciliazione, already in Italian territory. He returned back to St. Peter's Basilica where he, along with the cardinals, and the patriarchs of Eastern Catholic Churches, processed to the Confessio. There, Pope Leo XIV and the Eastern Rite patriarchs prayed before Saint Peter's tomb, where the Pallium and Ring of the Fisherman were laid and later taken into procession. The pope and the cardinals processed to St. Peter's Square, while the Laudes Regiae were sung by the choir.

Compared to previous inaugurations, the imposition of the pallium, the prayer for the Pope, and the giving of the Ring of the Fisherman was tasked to select cardinals from each order instead of the senior cardinal from each order. Pope Leo XIV used the same type of pallium as those worn by Metropolitan Archbishops (Pope Benedict XVI and Pope Francis used a modified pallium, though the latter reverted to the present form in 2014). The Ring of the Fisherman of Pope Leo XIV bears an image of St. Peter outside, with the coat of arms and his papal name inside, in accordance with tradition. Italian Cardinal Mario Zenari, Apostolic Nuncio to Syria, representing the Cardinal-Deacons and Europe, placed the pallium. Congolese Cardinal Fridolin Ambongo Besungu, Archbishop of Kinshasa, representing the Cardinal-Priests and Africa, led the prayer. Filipino Cardinal Luis Antonio Tagle, Pro-Prefect of the Dicastery for Evangelization, representing the Cardinal-Bishops and Asia, presented the ring to Pope Leo XIV. Similar to Pope Benedict XVI's Inauguration in 2005, the act of homage was done by select representative cardinals, bishops, religious, and lay faithful.

The pope delivered his Regina Caeli address before the final blessing, appealing for peace in war-torn parts of the world, praying for people suffering because of war, especially in Gaza, Myanmar, and Ukraine. He thanked all participants of the Mass, as well as the official delegations from different parts of the world, along with those participating in the already-scheduled Jubilee of Confraternities as part of the 2025 Jubilee. Following the Mass, the pope individually greeted the dignitaries inside St. Peter's Basilica, donning the papal choir dress (stole, mozzetta, pectoral cross, and rochet).

== Liturgical book ==
Ad hoc rituals were used for the inaugurations of the pontificates of Popes John Paul I and John Paul II. On 20 April 2005, Pope Benedict XVI approved a permanent rite, a draft of which had been made by the Office of Liturgical Celebrations of the Supreme Pontiff under John Paul II. This was published as an official liturgical book of the church with the name Ordo Rituum pro Ministerii Petrini Initio Romae Episcopi (Order of the Rites for the Inauguration of the Petrine Ministry of the Bishop of Rome). Archbishop Piero Marini, the Papal Master of Ceremonies, described it as part of the application to papal rites of the liturgical reforms following the Second Vatican Council.

The Ordo contains not only the text and rubrics for the Mass of the Inauguration, but also of the Mass of the Enthronement on the cathedra romana, the physical chair of the pope as Bishop of Rome in the Lateran Basilica, Rome's cathedral and thus the church's only archbasilica (outranking even Saint Peter's). Popes usually take possession of the Lateran Basilica within a few days of the inauguration of their pontificate.

Shortly before he resigned, Pope Benedict XVI introduced some modifications: strictly non-sacramental ceremonies must not take place within Mass but either before Mass or without Mass; the individual act of homage by each cardinal is restored; a wider choice of music is provided; and the time for taking possession of the basilicas of Saint Paul Outside the Walls and Saint Mary Major is not limited to the two or three weeks following the inauguration.

== List of papal inaugurations ==
Date	Location	Pope	Cardinal	Deaconry
3 September 1978	St. Peter's Square, Vatican City	John Paul I	Pericle Felici	Sant'Apollinare alle Terme Neroniane-Alessandrine
22 October 1978	St. Peter's Square, Vatican City	John Paul II	Pericle Felici	Sant'Apollinare alle Terme Neroniane-Alessandrine
24 April 2005	St. Peter's Square, Vatican City	Benedict XVI	Jorge Medina	San Saba
19 March 2013	St. Peter's Square, Vatican City	Francis	Jean-Louis Tauran	Sant'Apollinare alle Terme Neroniane-Alessandrine
18 May 2025	St. Peter's Square, Vatican City	Leo XIV	Mario Zenari	Santa Maria delle Grazie alle Fornaci fuori Porta Cavalleggeri

== See also ==
- Papal coronation
- Index of Vatican City-related articles
