= Pallium =

Latin Liturgical vestment worn by metropolitans

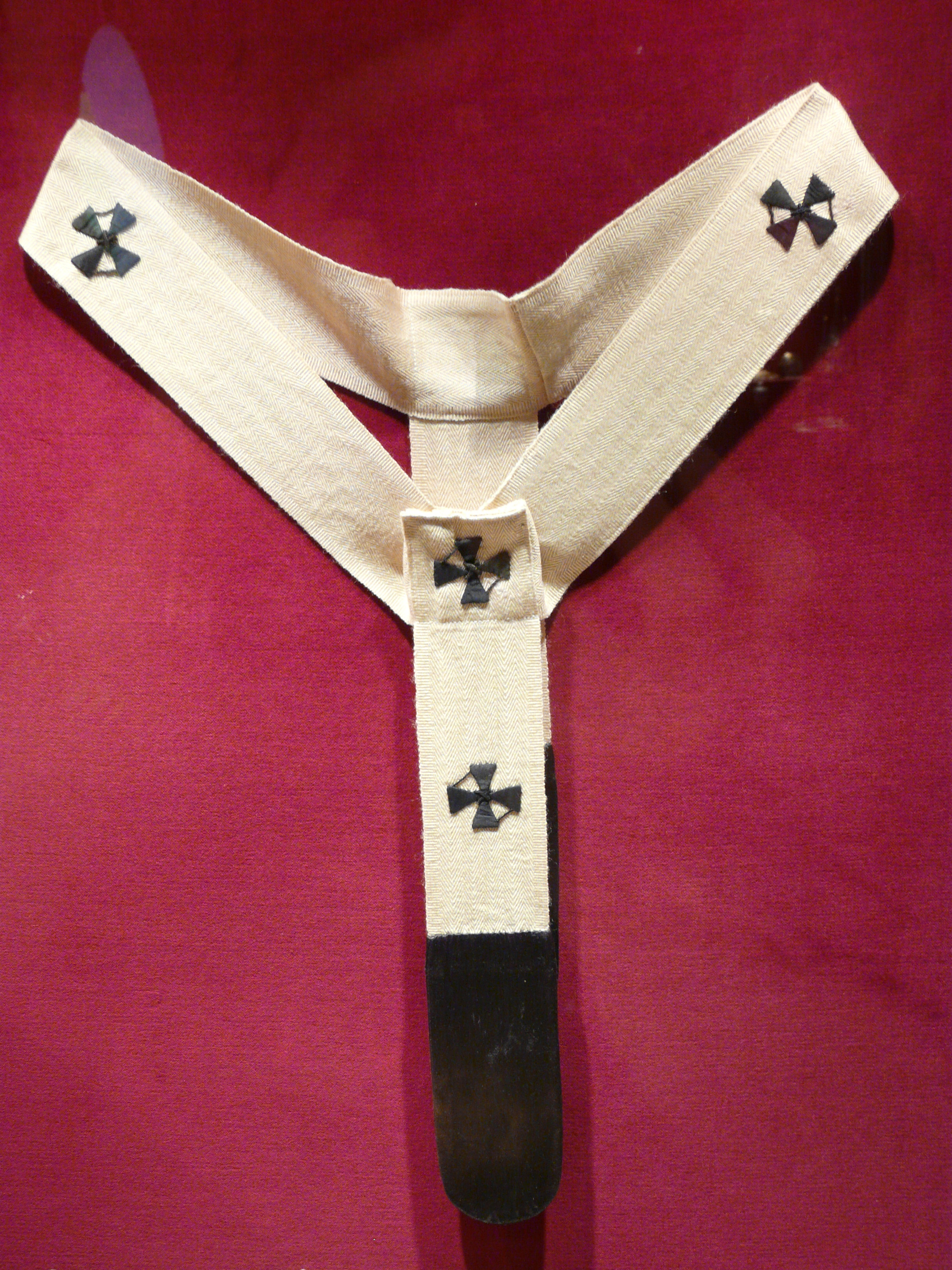
A pallium of Pope John XXIII in the museum of the Archdiocese of Gniezno

The pallium (from Latin pallium, a cloak or mantle; plural pallia) is a liturgical vestment of the Latin Church, worn by metropolitan archbishops, including the pope. (Note: The Pope is the Metropolitan of the Roman Province.) In its present form it is a narrow circular band of white wool that rests on the shoulders over the chasuble, with a strip hanging down the front and another down the back. It is marked with six black crosses and fastened with three pins, but never on the right shoulder. (Note: The right shoulder is intentionally left with no pin to symbolize the three nails of Christ's crucifixion. A notable exeption to this was from 2005 to 2008 when Pope Benedict XVI wore an ancient, asymmetrical style of pallium that required pinning on the right shoulder. Some metropolitans do not follow this tradition) The 1983 Code of Canon Law states that the pallium signifies the power a metropolitan holds by law in his ecclesiastical province, in communion with the Roman Church, and he may wear it only within that province. The Pope may wear it anywhere, as a sign of his universal jurisdiction.

The origins of the garment are obscure. The Liber Pontificalis places the first papal grant of the right to wear it in the fourth century, but the earliest datable grants to bishops are in the sixth century, when popes began to confer it on selected bishops, many of them metropolitans or papal vicars. From the eighth century onwards, the papacy increasingly expected western metropolitans to request the pallium from Rome. Between the eighth and twelfth centuries this practice turned the vestment into a means by which popes bound bishops to Rome and extended their authority over the western church, while also conferring prestige on its recipients. By the end of the eleventh century papal documents consistently described the pallium worn by the pope as a sign of the plenitudo pontificalis officii, the fullness of the pontifical office.

Concurrently, over the same centuries, the vestment changed from a long band draped across the shoulders into a Y-shaped band and, by the tenth or eleventh century, a closed circle with hanging ends. In the twenty-first century popes have worn pallia of differing design; Pope Benedict XVI uniquely used a long, wide form resembling an Omophorion, and later, one in the form of the Pallium of Pope John XXIII but with red crosses, sharing it with Pope Francis; later in Francis' pontificate he switched to a pallium with black crosses that his successor, Pope Leo XIV uses. Since a motu proprio of Paul VI in 1978 the pallium has been reserved to metropolitans, with a customary exception for the dean of the College of Cardinals. New pallia are blessed by the pope on the Feast of Saints Peter and Paul, 29 June. Latin Church explanations connect the vestment with the Good Shepherd carrying a lamb on his shoulders and with the metropolitan's bond of communion with the pope.

== Description ==
The pallium is a circular band of white wool, a few inches wide, worn around the neck and shoulders over the chasuble, with one pendant hanging in front and one behind. (Note: Different accounts of its dimensions. A 2011 description states a width of about two inches and pendants of about twelve inches, while Catholic News Service in 2025 gave three inches and fourteen inches.) Six small black crosses are woven into it: one on the breast, one on the back, one on each shoulder and one on each pendant. Only the crosses on the breast, back and left shoulder have loops that hold three gold pins (spinulae), often set with jewels. The ends of the pendants are tipped with black silk and weighted with small pieces of lead. The pendants' black tips are explained as recalling the dark hooves of the sheep that the archbishop symbolically carries.

The wool is traditionally taken in part from two lambs. These lambs are presented on the feast of Saint Agnes (21 January) by the Lateran Canons Regular to the chapter of the Lateran Basilica, blessed, and shown to the pope. They are then entrusted to the Benedictine nuns of Santa Cecilia in Trastevere, who shear them shortly before Easter. Every pallium is woven to include at least some of this wool. Once made, the pallia are placed in a silver-gilt casket in the confessio of Saint Peter's Basilica, close to the tomb of Saint Peter, and are taken from there to the pope for the Mass of 29 June, the feast of Saints Peter and Paul.

== History ==
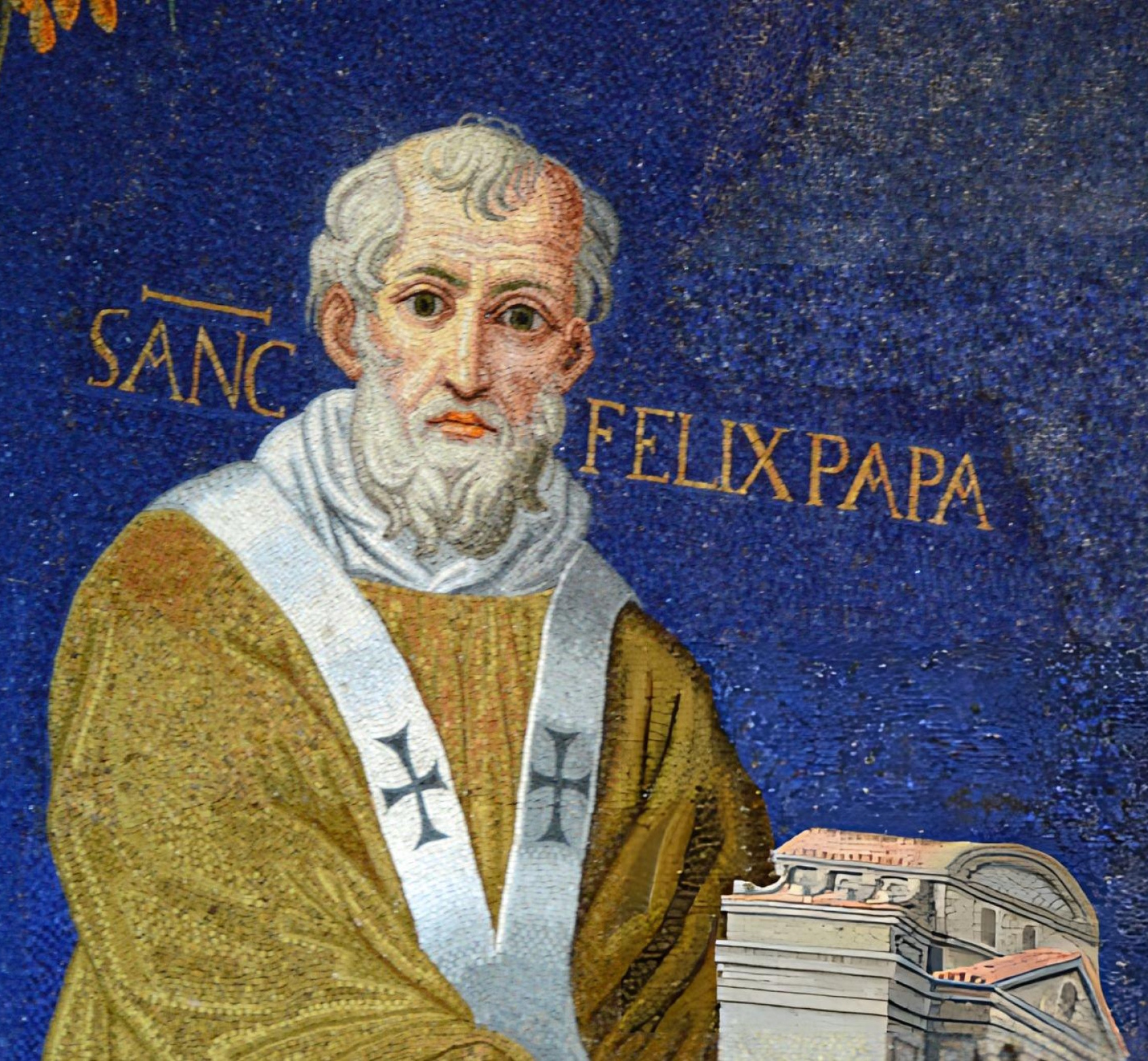
Scholars see Pope Felix IV's handing on the pallium to his successor, Pope Boniface II as evideience the pallium signified the papal office

Saint Peter bestowing the pallium on Pope Leo III (left), opposite Charlemagne, in the mosaic of Triclinium Leoninum

Scholars disagree about where the pallium came from. Some have argued for a Roman origin, others for derivation from the Greek himation, a rectangular cloth draped over the left shoulder. In 1911, Joseph Braun listed six hypotheses and rejected three of them: that the pallium derived from an investiture by Constantine the Great or one of his successors, from the Jewish high priest's ephod, or from a mantle of Saint Peter. He considered it more likely that the pallium was introduced as a liturgical badge of the pope, or adopted in imitation of the omophorion already used in the East. The eight-century Donation of Constantine described Constantine as granting papal insignia to Pope Sylvester I, including a lorum commonly identified with the pallium.

The Liber Pontificalis reports that Pope Pope Marcus (died 336) gave the right to wear the pallium to the bishop of Ostia, who by custom consecrated the pope. Braun treated that notice, whose source dates from the beginning of the sixth century, together with Pope Pope Symmachus's grant to Caesarius of Arles in 513, as showing that the pallium was in use at Rome by the fifth century. More firm evidence is found in the sixth century. Pope Felix IV is said to have given his own pallium to the archdeacon whom he nominated as his successor, the future Pope Boniface II, and Braun saw this as evidence that the pallium then symbolised papal office. Pope Vigilius granted it to Auxanius and Aurelianus, successors of Caesarius at Arles, and Pope Gregory the Great granted it to bishops including Syagrius of Autun, Donus of Messina, John of Syracuse, John of Palermo and Augustine of Canterbury. Braun noted that the honour usually went to metropolitans, especially those named papal vicars, but sometimes to simple bishops. The pallium also appears in sixth-century mosaics at Ravenna, including those of Archbishop Maximian and Bishop Ecclesius in the church of San Vitale.

By then the vestment was already regulated. Gregory the Great's correspondence with John of Ravenna shows that it was normally to be worn only at Mass unless a special privilege allowed otherwise. Braun also reported that a payment was made for pallia as early as the sixth century, that Gregory abolished it at a Roman synod in 595, and that it was later reintroduced as a contribution to the maintenance of the Holy See.

=== Papal control in the Middle Ages ===
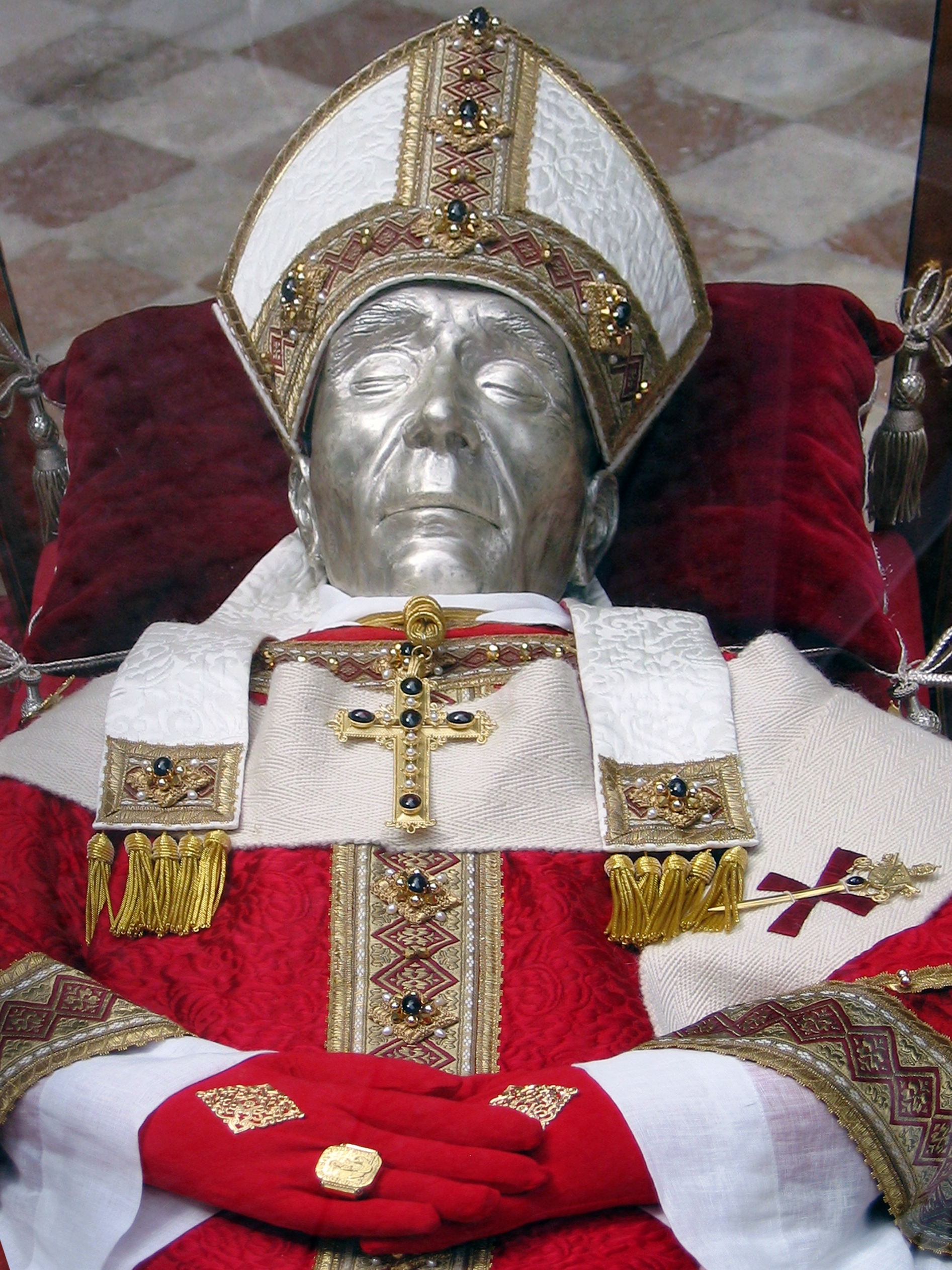
The Body of Pope Celestine V (r. 1294) seen in full papal vestments wearing a pallium that runs horizontal across the upper chest, going over his left shoulder

The pallium became an instrument of reform during the Frankish Papacy in the middle of the eighth century. In a letter of about 747 to Cuthbert of Canterbury, archbishop of Canterbury, Boniface reported that a synod of the Frankish church had resolved to remain subject to Rome and that its metropolitans would ask for their pallia from the Roman see. He added that a metropolitan, once he had received his pallium, was to exhort and admonish the other bishops of his province. Braun dated the point at which the practice became general to the ninth century, when western metropolitans were required to petition for the pallium, accompanied by a profession of faith, and were forbidden to perform consecrations until they had received it. He read the rule as an attempt to bind metropolitans more closely to Rome and to counter the aspirations of those who sought autonomy.

Popes used the grant of the pallium to examine, approve and on occasion discipline bishops, who were eventually required to request it from Rome. From 741 to 1119, the rules governed the time allowed for requesting the pallium (three months), the way of receiving it (in person or through envoys or papal legates) and the occasions on which it could be worn (inside churches, on designated feasts). Without it a metropolitan could not consecrate bishops or hold councils. Accounts from this period describe popes receiving the pallium from the pope's hands or taking it from the altar of Saint Peter on papal command. In the age of the Gregorian Reform and the Investiture Contest, popes, kings and bishops all used the pallium in disputes over papal supremacy and lay control of church acts. The chancery formulas that accompanied grants were reshaped under John of Gaeta, the future Pope Gelasius II (1118-1119). Gratian, the Decretists and the Decretalists absorbed the pallium into canon law.Scholars such as R. N. Swanson, called its case strong and one that future studies of the medieval papacy will need to take into account.

The oath of fidelity that a recipient takes appears, according to Braun, in the eleventh century, in the pontificate of Pope Paschal II (r. 1099–1118), and replaced the earlier profession of faith. Use of the pallium remained restricted. Grants of general use were made to Hincmar of Reims by Pope Leo IV in 851 and to Bruno of Cologne by Pope Agapetus II in 954. These were departures from a rule, that in the tenth and eleventh centuries limited the pallium to a few festivals and extraordinary occasions. Medieval writers also interpreted its shape, colour and ornament allegorically.

Payments connected with the pallium continued to attract criticism, and later condemned by the Latin Church. Popes charged a fee to those receiving them, acquiring hundreds of millions of gold florins for the papacy and bringing the award of the pallium into disrepute. The Council of Basel decreed in 1435 that nothing was to be exacted in the curia or elsewhere for sacred orders, blessings or pallia, or for confirmations, annates and similar dues, on pain of the penalties for simony. The attempt to abolish such exactions was only partly successful, since the Concordat of Vienna (1448) confirmed the older German arrangements for the payment of annates and servitia.

=== Changes of form ===
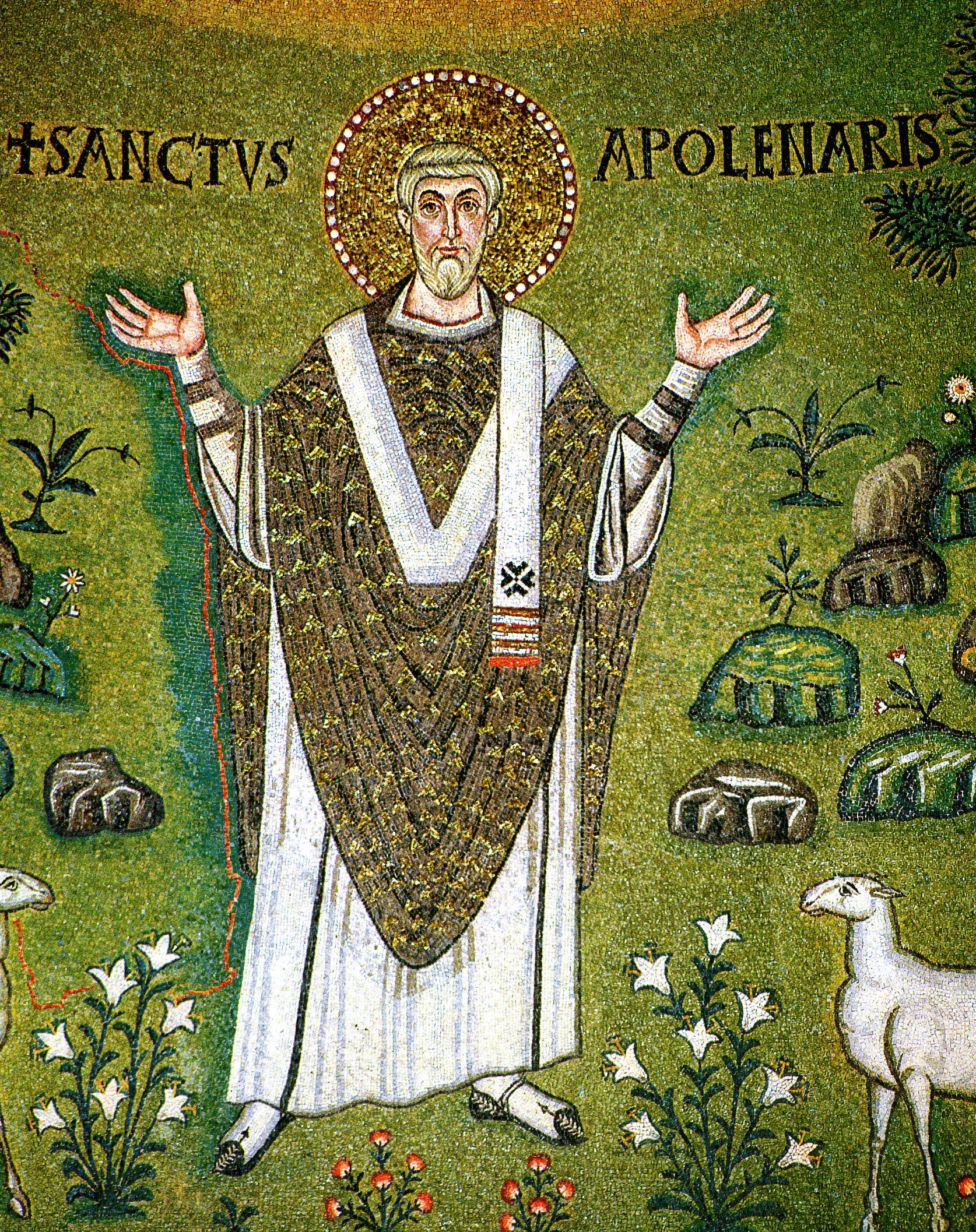
Apollinaris of Ravenna wearing the pallium, in a sixth-century apse mosaic at the Basilica of Sant'Apollinare in Classe

Braun reconstructed the form of the pallium from pictorial evidence, mosaics and surviving objects. On his account, the pallium of the sixth century, as shown in the Ravenna mosaics, was a long, moderately wide band of white wool with a black or red cross and tassels at each end, draped so as to form a V on the chest, with the ends hanging from the left shoulder, one in front and one behind. In the eighth century the ends began to be let fall down the middle of the chest and back and pinned there, giving the band a Y shape. In the ninth century, first according to depictions from outside Rome, the band was sewn in this Y shape, and the closed circle with pendants had appeared by the tenth or eleventh century. Two early examples of the circular form, associated with Archbishop Heribert of Cologne (d. 1021) and Archbishop Anno II (d. 1075), are preserved in Siegburg, Germany.

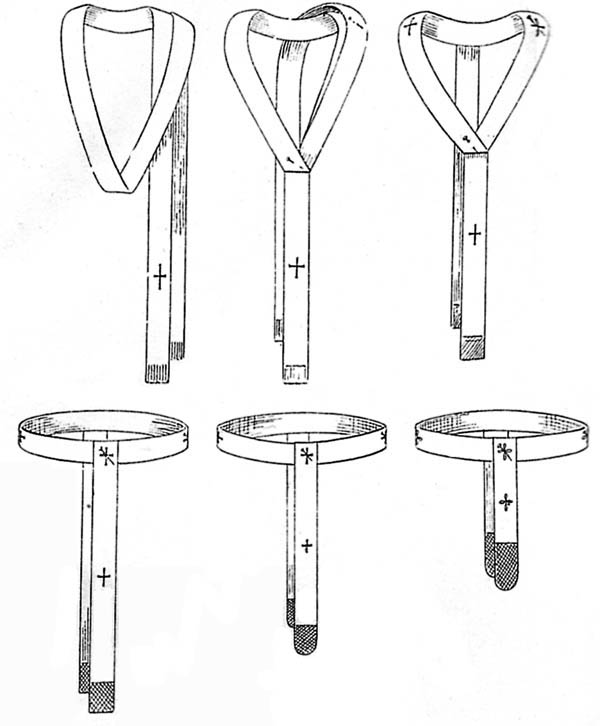
Diagram of the development of the pallium with time going from left to right, top to bottom

The decoration changed more slowly. The mosaics of Ravenna and Rome show only two crosses near the ends of the band at first. More crosses were sewn on from the ninth century, especially over the shoulders, but in the Middle Ages there was no fixed number or colour, the crosses being generally dark and sometimes in red. The pins, which had originally held the band in place, were kept as ornaments after it was sewn into shape. Pendants were weighted with small leaden pieces by the thirteenth century, as the pallia found on the body of Pope Boniface VIII when his tomb was opened in 1605 and in the tomb of Pope Clement IV show. The pendants remained very long into the later Middle Ages and were shortened afterwards.

=== Modern papal adaptations ===
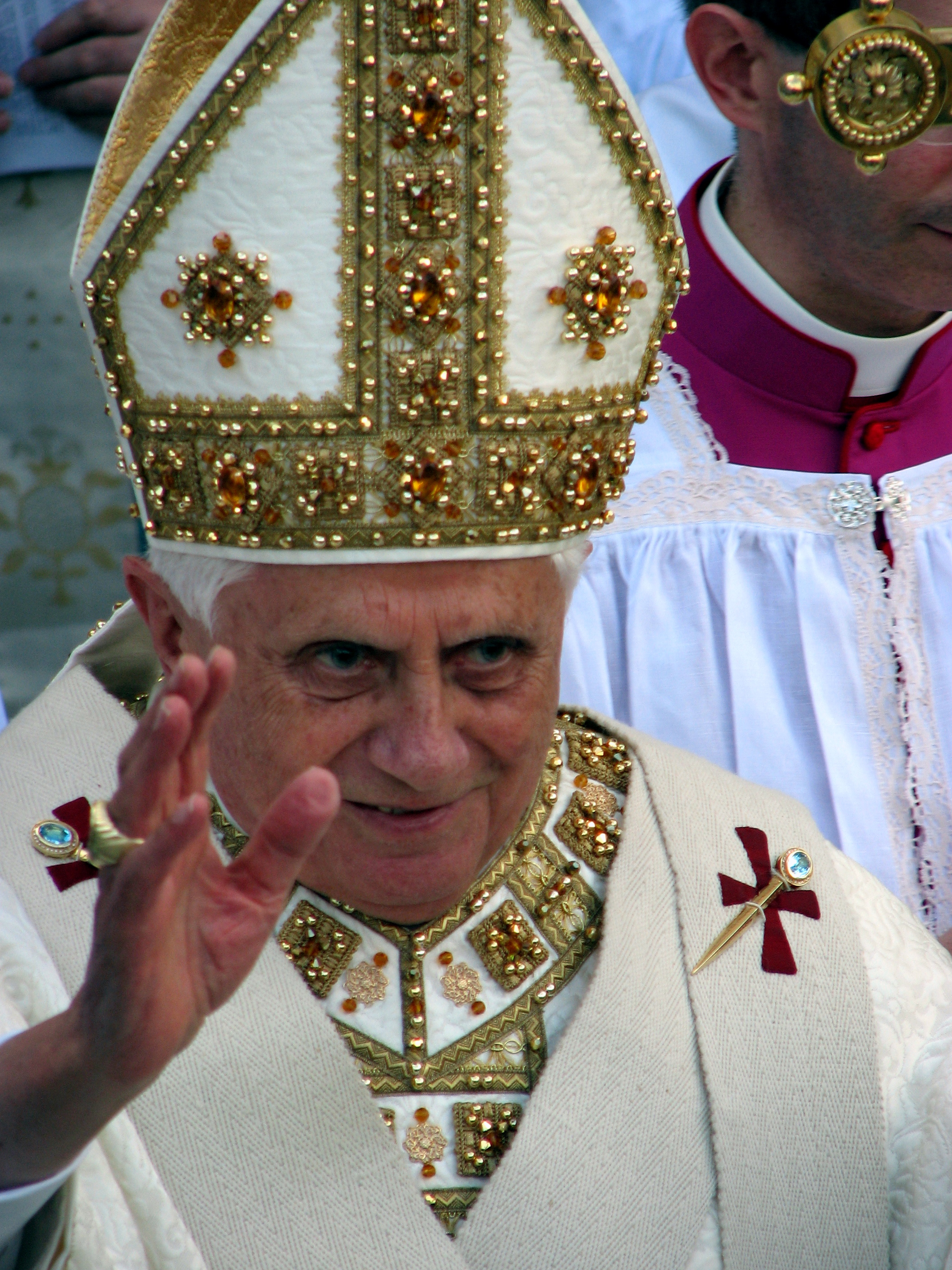
Benedict XVI pictured in May 2008 wearing his long papal pallium he wore from 2005-2008, with his pallium's pins visible

Since the abandonment of papal coronation in 1978, the pope has received the pallium at a inauguration Mass. For his inauguration on 24 April 2005, Pope Benedict XVI wore a pallium longer and wider than the metropolitan form, with five red silk crosses in place of six black ones and three pins. In an interview with L'Osservatore Romano in June 2008, the master of papal liturgical celebrations, Guido Marini, explained that this long pallium, crossed over the left shoulder, had not been worn in the West since the ninth century. He suggested that the fresco of Innocent III at the Sacro Speco at Subiaco, painted about 1219, which shows the type, was a deliberate archaism. From 29 June 2008, the Feast of Saints Peter and Paul, the pope used a closed circular pallium with two hanging ends, wider and longer than that of metropolitans and with red crosses, which Marini described as a development of the form used up to John Paul II. He gave as reasons the wish to show continuous development of the vestment and the practical problems that the earlier pallium had caused during ceremonies. He added that the difference between the papal pallium and the metropolitan's expresses the different jurisdictions that they signify.

Pope Francis wore at his inauguration in 2013 the pallium that Benedict XVI had used, with red crosses. The papal pallium later reverted to a simpler form with black crosses, a change that continues under Pope Leo XIV. At Leo's inauguration Mass on 18 May 2025, Leo XIV received a pallium with six black silk crosses and three pins.

== Relationship with the Omophorion ==
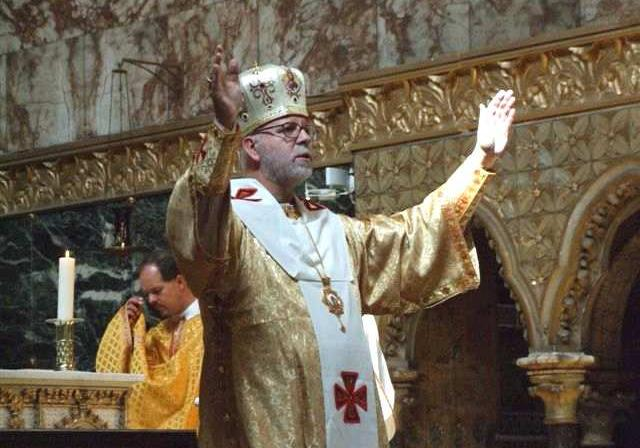
UGCC Bishop Paul Chomnycky of the wearing a white omophorion with red crosses

The omophorion is the corresponding vestment of Byzantine-rite bishops. Unlike the pallium, it is worn by all bishops, not only metropolitans.The Omophorion is a broad band with crosses, draped loosely over the neck, shoulders and chest, like the original Roman pallium, was testified as a bishop's liturgical vestment by Isidore of Pelusium in c. 400, when it was made of wool and symbolised the bishop's duty as shepherd. It is not wholly implausible that the pallium was adopted in imitation of the omophorion, the other possibility, according to Braun, was that the pallium was introduced directly as a papal liturgical badge. Braun also considered it most likely that the omophorion itself derived from a civil shoulder garment of the same name.

== Present-day use ==
Pope Francis in Mexico wearing the current form of the pallium, one with black crosses

Under the current 1983 Code of Canon Law, a metropolitan presides over an ecclesiastical province, and the office is attached to a see determined by the pope. Within three months of his episcopal consecration or, if already a bishop, of his canonical appointment, a metropolitan must request the pallium from the pope, personally or through a proxy. He may wear it according to the liturgical laws in any church of his province but not outside it, even with the consent of the diocesan bishop, and he needs a new pallium if he is transferred to another metropolitan see. The pope may wear the pallium, as he is a metropolitan aswell, but across the whole world. (Note: The Bishop of Rome's right to wear it anywhere flows from his Universal Jurisdiction, as the pallium is a sign of metropolitan jurisdiction.)

This restriction originates from Pope Paul VI's 11 May 1978 motu proprio Inter eximia episcopalis officii insignia, where he decreed that the pallium was thereafter to be granted only to metropolitans and removed the privileges and customs by which some local churches and individual prelates had enjoyed it. Those who already held the pallium by privilege could keep it while they headed their archdioceses, but the privilege ended with their term. Archbishops who are not metropolitans, and metropolitans who have left their sees, no longer have a right to the pallium. A metropolitan who attends a ceremony outside his province may not wear it there, even if the local bishop allows. The same motu proprio decrees that if a man is elected pope, who is not yet a bishop, when he's consecrated a bishop, the right to wear the pallium at the episcopal ordination belongs to the dean of the College of Cardinals, or to the cardinal who performs the ordination.

In practice, the dean of the College of Cardinals, who is also cardinal bishop of Ostia, receives a pallium although he is not a metropolitan. This exception applies to the dean rather than to the rest of the cardinal-bishops. Pope John Paul II gave a pallium to Cardinal Joseph Ratzinger, later Pope Benedict XVI, on the day before he was installed as bishop of Ostia in March 2003, Benedict XVI gave one to Cardinal Angelo Sodano after Sodano was elected dean in 2005, and Francis gave one to Cardinal Giovanni Battista Re on 29 June 2020, when Re received it with the metropolitan archbishops of that year. Some reports say that this tradition started with Pope Marcus (r. 336).

The rite of conferral has changed several times in recent decades. John Paul II began in 1983 to place the pallium on new archbishops personally, and in 2015 Francis changed the ceremony so that the archbishops attended the Mass of 29 June and the blessing of the pallia in Rome but received them in their own archdioceses from the apostolic nuncio. Leo XIV restored the personal imposition by the pope in 2025. On 29 June 2025 he blessed the pallia at Mass in Saint Peter's Basilica. The deacons brought them from the confessio of Saint Peter, and the cardinal protodeacon presented 54 new metropolitan archbishops, who took an oath of fidelity to the pope and the Church of Rome. The pope placed the pallium on each one's shoulders.

== Meaning ==
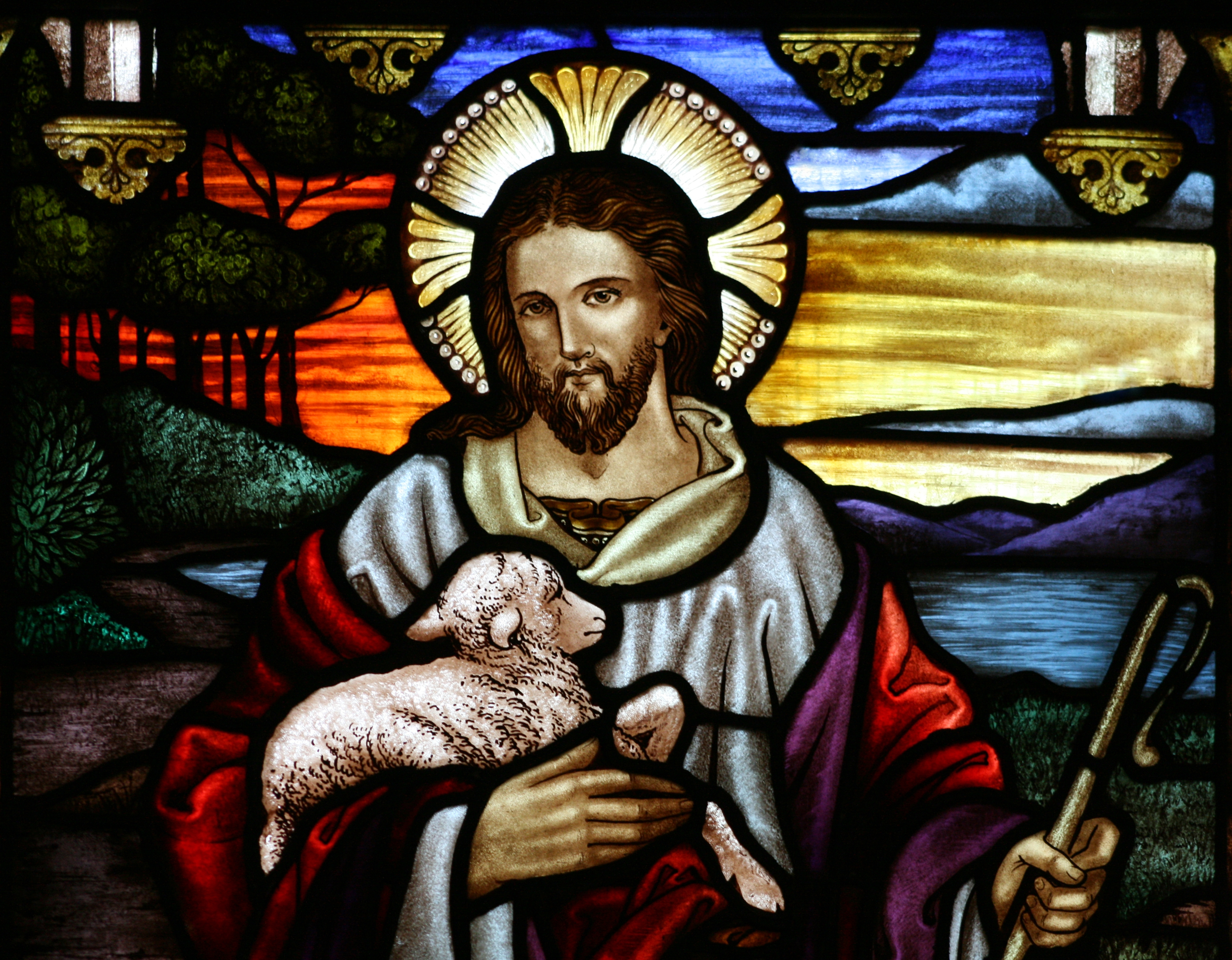
The Good Shepherd, carrying a lamb, symbolised by the pallium. Stained Glass from St John's, Ashfield

The pallium is a sign of the metropolitan's communion with the bishop of Rome and of his pastoral mission, the woollen band recalling the sheep that the Good Shepherd carries on his shoulders. The 1983 Code of Canon Law states that it signifies the power that the metropolitan has by law in his own province, in communion with the Roman Church. In 1983 John Paul II described it to new archbishops as a symbol of privileged communion with the successor of Peter, the visible foundation of unity in doctrine, discipline and pastoral work, and as a call to greater love for souls. A 2011 commentary also reports the interpretation of the Greek liturgist Simon of Thessalonica, who explained the vestment as the Saviour who finds the lost sheep and carries it on his shoulders, and notes that the white wool is taken to remind the wearer that all authority comes from the Lamb of God.

The meaning of the Pallium has evolved over time. Braun held that in the sixth century the pallium symbolised the papal office and power, whereas for metropolitans it originally signified union with the Apostolic See and was an ornament symbolising virtue. For Braun, the development of its symbolism was complete by about the end of the eleventh century, after which papal documents consistently called it the sign of the plenitudo pontificalis officii. For Schoenig, the medieval papacy created in the pallium a mechanism of control over distant bishops, through which popes shared honour and power with local prelates while exercising power over them. Schoenig argues that it formed part of the machinery of centralisation that helped to produce the high medieval papal monarchy.

== See also ==
- Investiture Controversy
- Omophorion
- Papal inauguration
- Pall (heraldry)

== Sources ==
- Biccini, Gianluca (26 June 2008). "Il pallio papale tra continuità e sviluppo" [The papal pallium between continuity and development]. L'Osservatore Romano (in Italian). p. 8. (Interview with Guido Marini.)
- Boniface (747). "Letter to Cuthbert, archbishop of Canterbury". Roman Letters.
- "Code of Canon Law, Book II, Part II, Title II: Groupings of particular churches (cann. 431-459)". Holy See.
- Paul VI (11 May 1978). "Inter eximia episcopalis officii insignia (De sacri Pallii concessione moderanda in Ecclesia Latina)" (Motu proprio) (in Latin).
- Schoenig, Steven A. (2016). Bonds of Wool: The Pallium and Papal Power in the Middle Ages. Studies in Medieval and Early Modern Canon Law. Vol. 15. Washington, DC: The Catholic University of America Press. ISBN 978-0-8132-2922-5.
- Skinner, Gerard (6 July 2011). "The Pallium". L'Osservatore Romano (Weekly English Edition). p. 4 – via EWTN Global Catholic Network.
- Swanson, R. N. (February 2018). "Bonds of Wool: The Pallium and Papal Power in the Middle Ages, by Steven A. Schoenig, SJ". The English Historical Review. 133 (560): 133–135. doi:10.1093/ehr/cex356.

Attribution
