= Laudes regiæ =

Catholic hymn

The laudes regiæ (English: "Royal Praises" or "Royal Acclamations") are a hymn used in the Latin Rite of the Catholic Church. There are variant texts, but they most often have the incipit that gives the hymn its alternative title: Christus vincit, Christus regnat, Christus imperat (English: "Christ conquers, Christ reigns, Christ commands"). Formularies of the laudes regiæ praising the Holy Roman Emperor are referred to more specifically as the laudes imperiales ("Imperial Praises").

The melody of the refrain is also used as an interval signal for Vatican Radio's shortwave transmissions.

== History ==
This hymn is sung in the Catholic Church at solemn events, such as the inauguration of a pope or, in centuries past, the coronation of the Holy Roman Emperor. It is also sung at processions, such as those held on the feasts of Corpus Christi and Christ the King.

The laudes regiæ has origins as far back as Ancient Rome: when leaders such as generals, emperors or consuls entered the City of Rome for a triumph after winning a battle, they were met with the chants from the people. Charlemagne later adopted such Roman traditions: when crowned Emperor of the Romans by Pope Leo III in Old St. Peter's Basilica on Christmas Day 800 A.D., laudes were sung during the coronation ceremony – possibly already including the formula "Christus vincit, Christus regnat, Christus imperat".

== Lyrics ==
Most versions begin with the formula "Christus vincit, Christus regnat, Christus imperat", followed by the invocation "Exaudi Christe" ("Hear, Christ!") and then an acclamation proper to the occasion, such as wishing long life for the reigning emperor or pope, with exclamations naming saints dating to the eighth century.

Latin lyrics Christus vincit! Christus regnat! Christus imperat! Christus vincit! Christus regnat! Christus imperat! Exaudi, Christe Exaudi, Christe Ecclesiae sanctae Dei salus perpetua Redemptor mundi, tu illam adiuva Sancta Maria, tu illam adiuva Sancta Mater Ecclesiae, tu illam adiuva Regina Apostolorum, tu illam adiuva Sancti Michael, Gabriel et Raphael vos illam adiuvate Sancte Ioannes Baptista, tu illam adiuva Sancte Ioseph, tu illam adiuva Christus vincit! Christus regnat! Christus imperat! Exaudi, Christe Exaudi, Christe N., Summo Pontifici et universali Patri, Pax vita et salus perpetua! Salvator mundi, tu illum adiuva Sancte Petre, tu illum adiuva Sancte Paule, tu illum adiuva Christus vincit! Christus regnat! Christus imperat! Exaudi, Christe Exaudi, Christe Episcopis catholicae et apostolicae fidei cultoribus, eorumque curis fidelibus, vita! Salvator mundi, tu illos adiuva Sancte Andrea, tu illos adiuva Sancte Iacobe, tu illos adiuva Sancte Ioannes, tu illos adiuva Sancte Thoma, tu illos adiuva Sancte Iacobe, tu illos adiuva Sancte Philippe, tu illos adiuva Sancte Bartholomaee, tu illos adiuva Sancte Matthaee, tu illos adiuva Sancte Simon, tu illos adiuva Sancte Thaddaee, tu illos adiuva Sancte Matthia, tu illos adiuva Sancte Barnaba, tu illos adiuva Sancte Luca, tu illos adiuva Sancte Marce, tu illos adiuva Sancti Timothee et Tite, vos illos adiuvate Christus vincit! Christus regnat! Christus imperat! Exaudi, Christe Exaudi, Christe Sancti Protomartyres Romani, vos illos adiuvate Sancte Ignati, tu illos adiuva Sancte Polycarpe, tu illos adiuva Sancte Cypriane, tu illos adiuva Sancte Bonifati, tu illos adiuva' Sancte Stanislae, tu illos adiuva Sancte Thoma, tu illos adiuva Sancti Ioannes et Thoma vos illos adiuvate Sancte Iosaphat, tu illos adiuva Sancte Paule, tu illos adiuva Sancte Ioannes et Isaac, vos illos adiuvate Sancte Petre, tu illos adiuva Sancte Carole, tu illos adiuva Sancta Agnes, tu illos adiuva Sancta Caecilia, tu illos adiuva Omnes sancti martyres, vos illos adiuvate Sancte Clemens, tu illos adiuva Sancte Athanasi, tu illos adiuva Sancte Leo Magne, tu illos adiuva Sancte Gregori Magne, tu illos adiuva Sancte Ambrosi, tu illos adiuva Sancte Augustine, tu illos adiuva Sancti Basili et Gregori, vos illos adiuvate Sancte Ioannes, tu illos adiuva Sancte Martine, tu illos adiuva Sancte Patrici, tu illos adiuva Sancti Cyrille et Methodi, vos illos adiuvate Sancte Carole, tu illos adiuva Sancte Roberte, tu illos adiuva Sancte Francisce, tu illos adiuva Sancte Ioannes Nepomucene, tu illos adiuva Sancte Pie, tu illos adiuva Omnes sancti pontifices et doctores, vos illos adiuvate Christus vincit! Christus regnat! Christus imperat! Exaudi, Christe Exaudi, Christe Populis cunctis et omnibus hominibus bonae voluntatis: pax a Deo, rerum ubertas morumque civilium rectitudo. Sancte Antoni, tu illos adiuva Sancte Benedicte, tu illos adiuva Sancte Bernarde, tu illos adiuva Sancte Francisce, tu illos adiuva Sancte Dominice, tu illos adiuva Sancte Philippe, tu illos adiuva Sancte Vincenti, tu illos adiuva Sancte Ioannes Maria, tu illos adiuva Sancta Catharina, tu illos adiuva Sancta Teresia a Iesu, tu illos adiuva Sancta Rosa, tu illos adiuva Omnes sancti presbyteri et religiosi, vos illos adiuvate Omnes sancti laici, vos illos adiuvate Christus vincit! Christus regnat! Christus imperat! Ipsi soli imperium, laus et iubilatio per infinita saecula saeculorum. Amen Christus vincit! Christus regnat! Christus imperat! Tempora bona habeant! Tempora bona habeant redempti sanguine Christi! Feliciter! Feliciter! Feliciter! Pax Christi veniat! Regnum Christi veniat! Deo gratias! Amen	English translation Christ conquers! Christ reigns! Christ commands! Christ conquers! Christ reigns! Christ commands! Hear, O Christ Hear, O Christ For the Church of God, everlasting safety! Redeemer of the world, come to her aid Holy Mary, come to her aid Holy Mother of the Church, come to her aid Queen of Apostles, come to her aid Saint Michael, Gabriel and Raphael, come to her aid Saint John the Baptist, come to her aid Saint Joseph, come to her aid Christ conquers! Christ reigns! Christ commands! Hear, O Christ Hear, O Christ For N., Supreme Pontiff and universal Father, Peace, life, and long life! Savior of the world, come to his aid Saint Peter, come to his aid Saint Paul, come to his aid Christ conquers! Christ reigns! Christ commands! Hear, O Christ Hear, O Christ For the bishops, custodians of the catholic and apostolic faith, and for the faithful in their care, life! Savior of the world, come to their aid Saint Andrew, come to their aid Saint James, come to their aid Saint John, come to their aid Saint Thomas, come to their aid Saint James, come to their aid Saint Philip, come to their aid Saint Bartholomew, come to their aid Saint Matthew, come to their aid Saint Simon, come to their aid Saint Jude, come to their aid Saint Matthias, come to their aid Saint Barnabas, come to their aid Saint Luke, come to their aid Saint Mark, come to their aid Saint Timothy and Titus, come to their aid Christ conquers! Christ reigns! Christ commands! Hear, O Christ Hear, O Christ First Martyrs of the Church of Rome, come to their aid Saint Ignatius, come to their aid Saint Polycarp, come to their aid Saint Cyprian, come to their aid Saint Boniface, come to their aid Saint Stanislas, come to their aid Saint Thomas, come to their aid Saints John and Thomas, come to their aid Saint Josaphat, come to their aid Saint Paul, come to their aid Saint John and Isaac, come to their aid Saint Peter, come to their aid Saint Charles, come to their aid Saint Agnes, 'come to their aid Saint Cecilia, come to their aid All ye holy martyrs, come to their aid Saint Clement, come to their aid Saint Athanasius, come to their aid Saint Leo the Great, come to their aid Saint Gregory the Great, come to their aid Saint Ambrose, come to their aid Saint Augustine, come to their aid Saints Basil and Gregory, come to their aid Saint John, come to their aid Saint Martin, come to their aid Saint Patrick, come to their aid Saints Cyril and Methodius, come to their aid Saint Charles, come to their aid Saint Robert, come to their aid Saint Francis, come to their aid Saint John of Nepomuk, come to their aid Saint Pius [X], come to their aid All ye holy bishops and doctors, come to their aid Christ conquers! Christ reigns! Christ commands! Hear, O Christ Hear, O Christ For all peoples and for all men of good will, God's peace, [...]!, Saint Anthony, come to their aid Saint Benedict, come to their aid Saint Bernard, come to their aid Saint Francis, come to their aid Saint Dominic, come to their aid Saint Philip, come to their aid Saint Vincent, come to their aid Saint John Mary, come to their aid Saint Catherine, come to their aid Saint Teresa of Jesus, come to their aid Saint Rose, come to their aid All ye holy priests and religious, come to their aid All ye holy lay people, come to their aid Christ conquers! Christ reigns! Christ commands! To him alone be authority, praise and rejoicing, through endless ages of ages. Amen Christ conquers! Christ reigns! Christ commands! May they have favorable times! May they have favorable times, those redeemed by the Blood of Christ! Happily! Happily! Happily! May the peace of Christ come! May the reign of Christ come! Thanks be to God. Amen.
