= Ring of the Fisherman =

Signet ring, part of the papal regalia

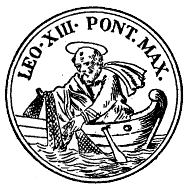
Anulus piscatoris of Pope Leo XIII

The Ring of the Fisherman (Latin: Anulus piscatoris; Italian: Anello Piscatorio), also known as the Piscatory Ring, is an official part of the regalia worn by the pope, who according to Catholic practice and tradition is the head of the Catholic Church and successor of Saint Peter, who was a fisherman by trade. It used to feature a bas-relief of Peter fishing from a boat, a symbolism derived from the tradition that the apostles were "fishers of men" (Mark 1:17). The Fisherman's Ring is a signet that was used until 1842 to seal official documents signed by the pope but is now used only ceremonially. Since at least the Middle Ages it has been a tradition for Catholics meeting the pope to show their devotion by kissing the ring.

== History ==
A letter written by Pope Clement IV to his nephew in the 13th century includes the earliest known mention of the Ring of the Fisherman, which was used for sealing the pope's private correspondence. Public documents, by contrast, were sealed by stamping a different papal seal onto lead which was attached to the document. Such documents were historically called papal bulls, named after the stamped bulla (seal) of lead. By the 15th century, the fisherman's ring began to be used to seal papal briefs, which are official but less formal documents. That practice ended in 1842, when the sealing wax was replaced by a stamp which affixed the same device in red ink. Lead seals continue to be used for apostolic letters.

The ring has been lost or stolen at various times. In a 1588 letter, the Spanish ambassador to Rome, Count Olivares, reported to Philip IV that a papal cup-bearer had stolen the Fisherman's Ring from Sixtus V. In 1797, after Napoleon's troops occupied Rome, the ring of Pius VI was briefly taken by French soldiers under the command of General Berthier. The ring was returned to Pius VI the next day, although he died in forced exile in Valence. Before the French abducted Pius VII, the pope reportedly broke the ring into two pieces, which were held in Paris until Louis XVIII returned them to Rome. In 1899, the Fisherman's Ring was reportedly lost before an underservant recovered it and returned it to Leo XIII; however, upon Leo's death in 1903, the ring was not found among his possessions.

The longstanding custom of kissing an episcopal ring (i.e., the ring of a bishop, including the pope), accompanied by the bending of the knee or the bowing of the head, was firmly established by the Middle Ages. A partial indulgence associated with kissing the Fisherman's Ring was granted by Pope Pius X in the early 20th century. However, Paul VI abolished this custom as well as other acts of subservience to the pope, such as the kissing of the pope's foot and cheek. The practice of kissing the ring has endured, although Francis (as archbishop of Buenos Aires and later pope) usually discouraged it, due to the ritual's connotations of clericalism and temporal power.

== Creation and design ==
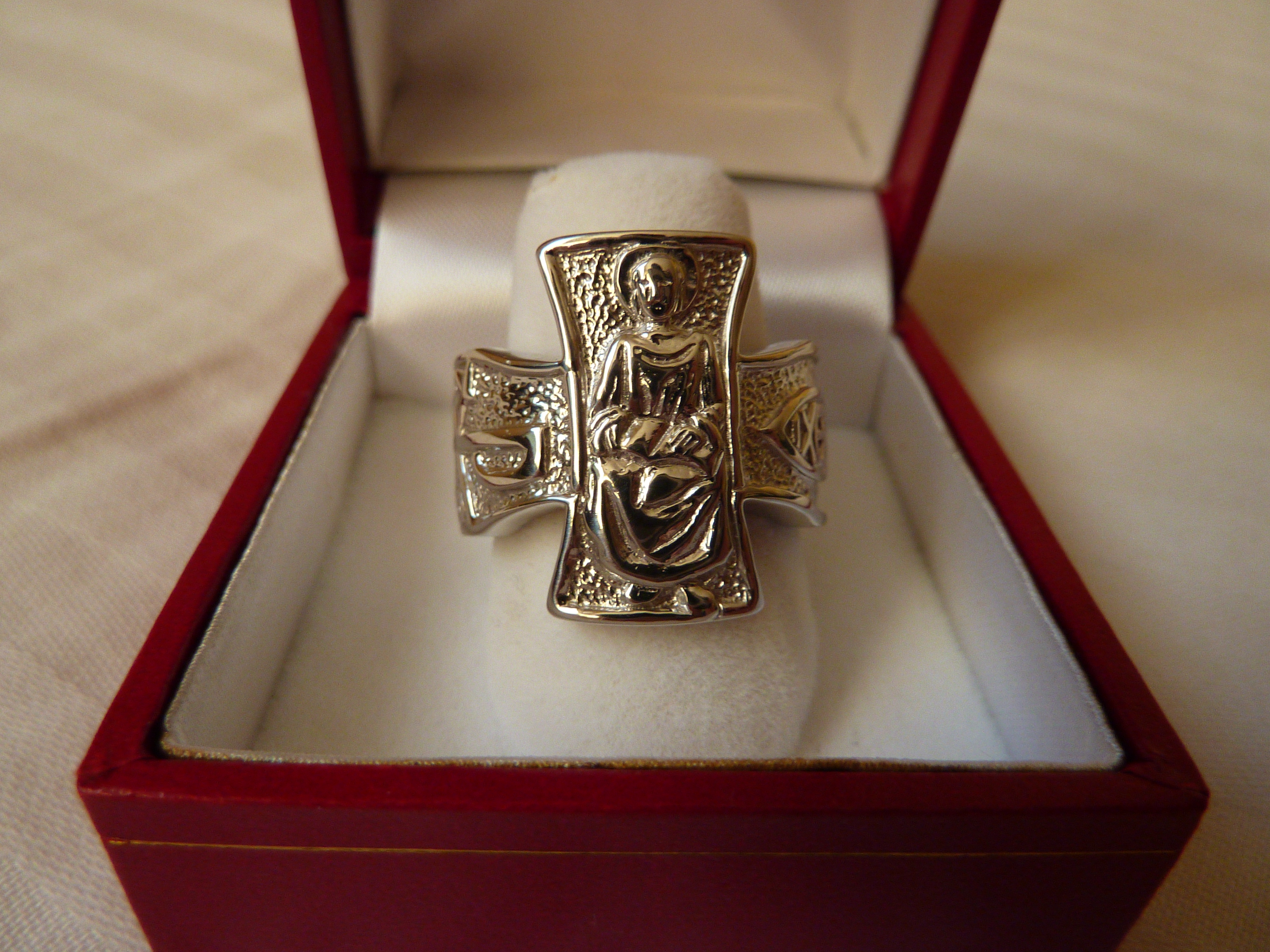
Silver copy of the ring of Pope John Paul II

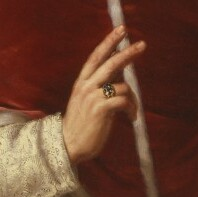
Detail of a painting showing the ring of Pope Pius VIII

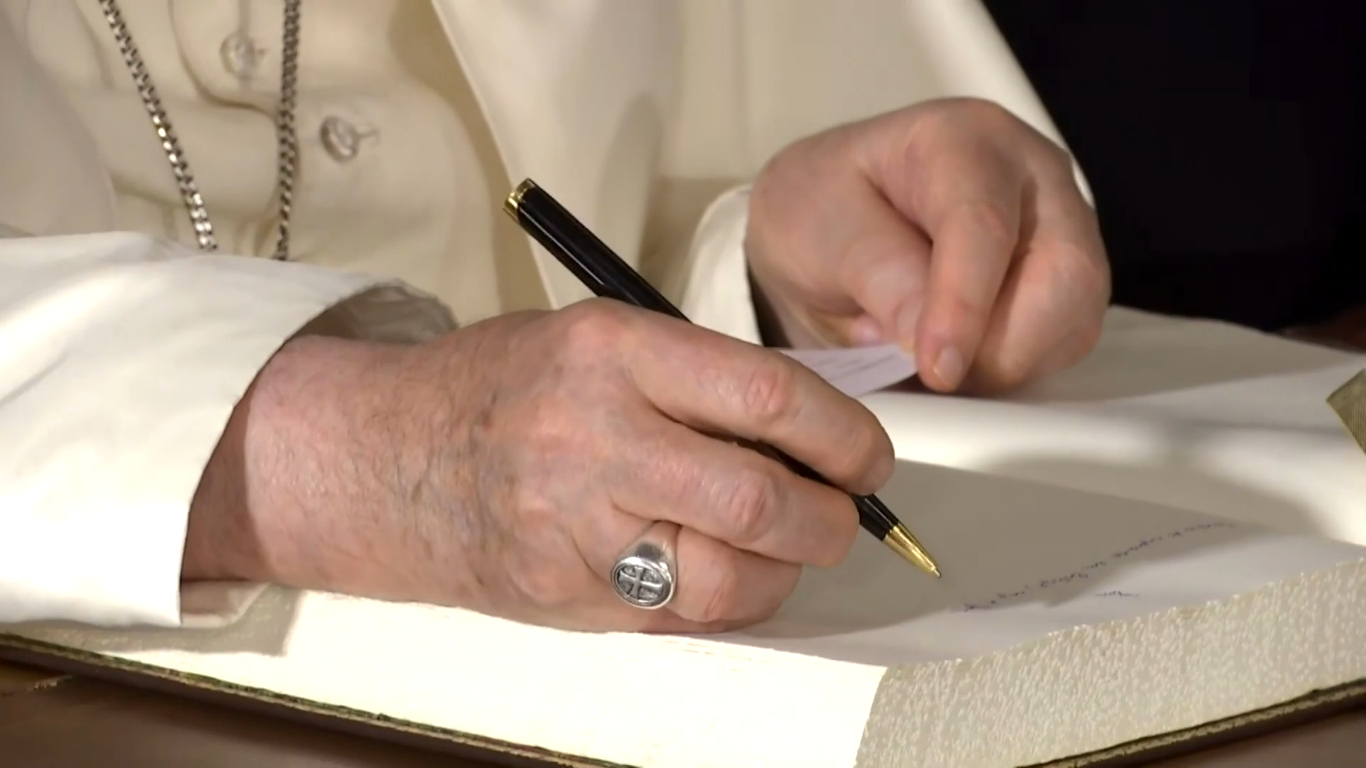
Pope Francis wearing a silver ring in 2023

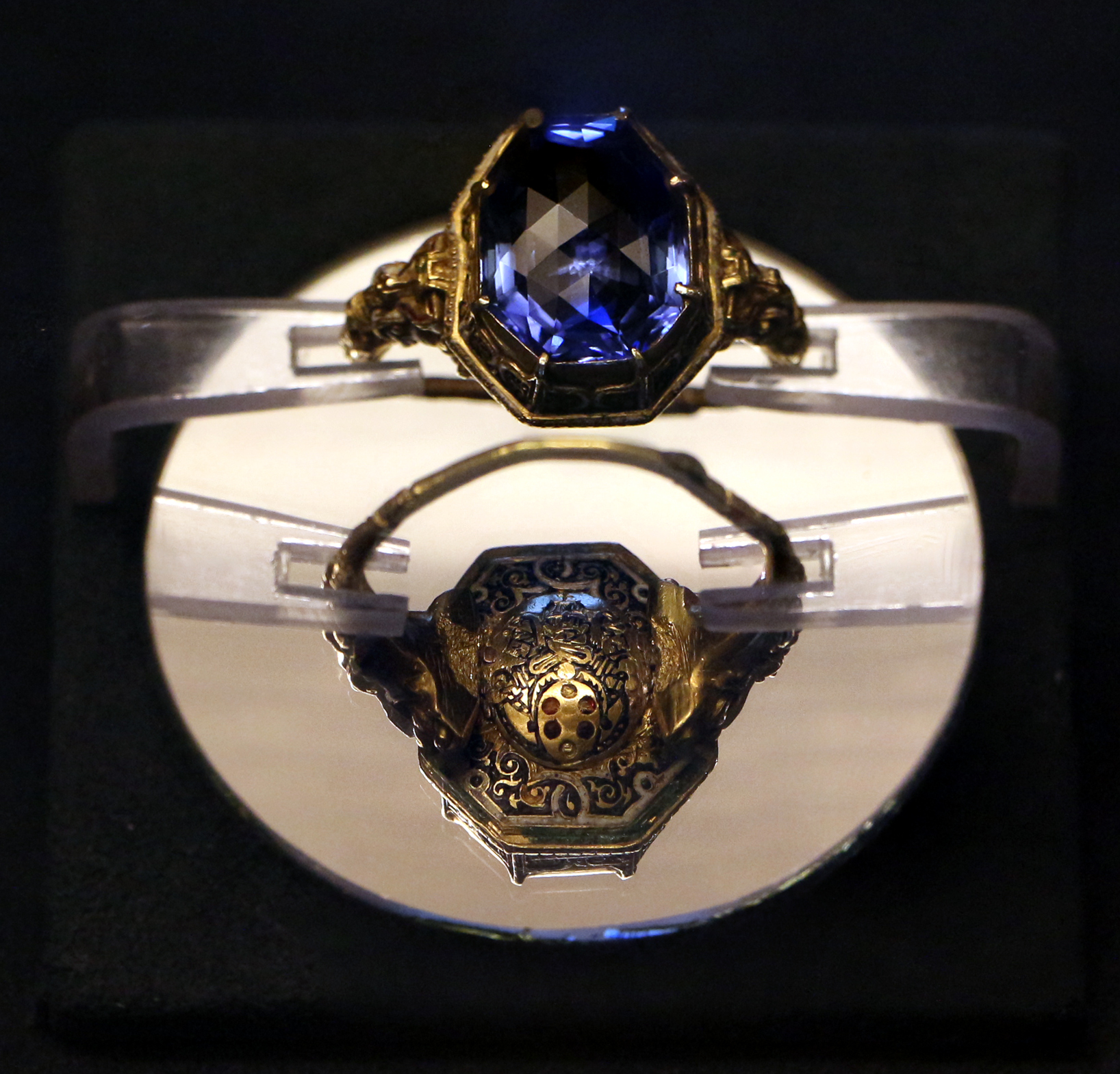
Ring of Pope Pius IV (1559–1565)

A new ring is traditionally cast for each pope, and the design features an image of Saint Peter along with an inscription of the pope's name in Latin. (For example, Benedictus XVI for Benedict XVI.) Past popes have used rings of various designs reflecting their own tastes. Pius IX's ornate ring contained more than a hundred diamonds; John XXIII's ring was a simple cameo, and John Paul II used hammered gold. Benedict XVI's ring was created by eight artisans under the direction of Claudio Franchi, a Roman goldsmith, and consisted of 35 grams of gold. Although the Fisherman's Ring is traditionally made of gold, Francis (reigned 2013-2025) chose one of gold-plated silver. Unusually, Francis's ring was based on a previously designed ring, created by Italian sculptor Enrico Manfrini (d. 2004) for Paul VI. Pope Leo XIV uses the papal ring constantly. At his inauguration he was given a gold ring, which he uses during liturgical celebrations, but outside of them he uses an identical silver ring.

== Presentation and use ==
During the ceremony of a papal coronation or papal inauguration, the Camerlengo traditionally slips the ring on the ring finger of the new pope's right hand. Benedict XVI had the dean of the College of Cardinals, Angelo Sodano, give him the ring, which he then placed upon himself. Pope Francis was likewise bestowed his ring by Sodano at his installation. On the inauguration of Pope Leo XIV, it was Luis Antonio Tagle, the junior among the Latin-Rite Cardinal-Bishops, who placed the ring on the new Pope, instead of the Dean, Giovanni Battista Re.

Benedict XVI wore the Fisherman's Ring daily, but other contemporary popes, including Benedict's successor Francis, wore it only during certain ceremonies. Pope Paul VI routinely wore a different ring, which commemorated the Second Vatican Council.

== Destruction ==
Historically, upon the death of a pope, the Camerlengo ceremonially destroyed the ring (as well as the bulla) using a hammer in the presence of the College of Cardinals. The practice of destroying a late pope's signet ring originated as a means to prevent the issuance of forged documents during the sede vacante (the interregnum between the death of one pope and the election of another).

The apostolic constitution Universi Dominici gregis, which governs procedures during the sede vacante, directs the College of Cardinals to "arrange for the destruction of the fisherman's ring and of the lead seal with which Apostolic Letters are dispatched" during a meeting of the general congregation of cardinals, but does not set a specific time when the destruction must occur. However, the ritual typically occurs during a meeting of the general congregation of cardinals that precedes the conclave to elect a successor.

The broken Fisherman's Ring of Pius IX is part of the Alice and Louis Koch Collection of 2,500 rings at the Swiss National Museum in Zurich.

Upon the resignation of Pope Benedict XVI in 2013, the first papal resignation in more than six hundred years, Benedict's signet ring was not destroyed but was instead defaced by applying two deep cuts in the shape of a cross using a chisel. The ring and seals of Pope Francis were cut with a chisel by a laywoman in front of the College of Cardinals at their last General Congregation on 6 May 2025, as seen in a video posted by Vatican News.
