= Alberto Cicerone =

Italian architect and artist (born 1966)

- Born: 14 August 1966 (age 60); Avezzano, Italy
- Occupation: Architect

Alberto Cicerone (born 14 August 1966) is an Italian architect and artist. Some of his works are placed in the Sistine Chapel.

== Biography ==
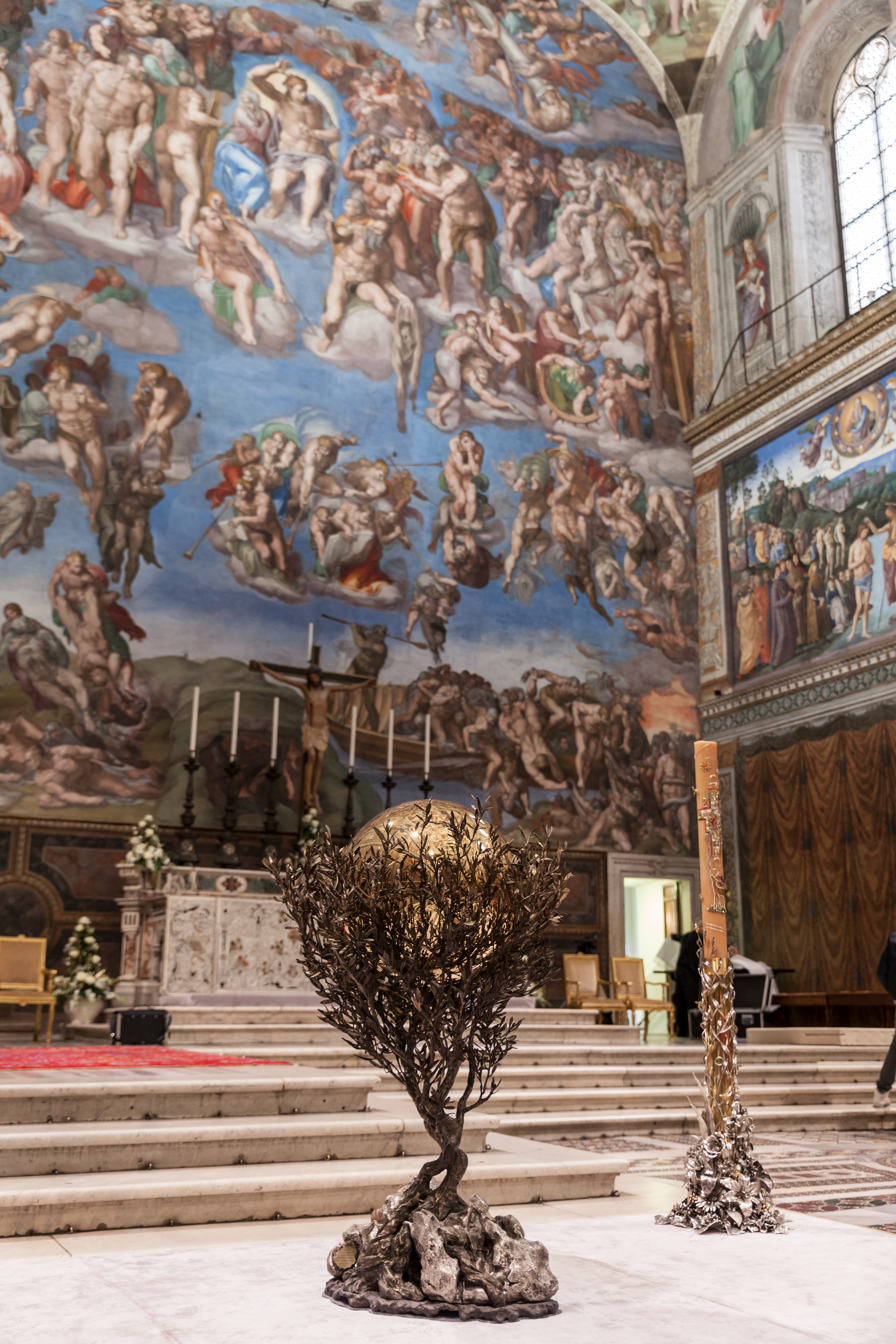
Baptismal font and candelabra for Paschal candle in Sistine Chapel

After graduating in Architecture from the D'Annunzio University of Chieti–Pescara, Cicerone obtained a master's degree in Sacred Architecture, Sacred Art and Liturgy from the Pontifical Athenaeum Regina Apostolorum, in European University of Rome.

Throughout his career as a designer, decorator, fresco painter, restorer, graphic artist and interior designer, Cicerone has specialized in sacred art, conceiving and designing numerous works for places of worship, which he has then realized together with his collaborators. In 2012, under commission from The Most Reverend Guido Marini, Master of Pontifical Liturgical Celebrations, and to mark the 500th anniversary of Michelangelo’s frescoed ceiling, he designed and created the baptismal font of the Sistine Chapel: a bronze olive tree whose roots cling to a silver rock and whose branches hold a golden sphere, symbolizing the rising sun. The font was used by Pope Benedict XVI on 8 January 2012 during the Feast of the Baptism of the Lord. Cicerone thus became the first contemporary artist to design and realize a commissioned artwork for the Sistine Chapel.

Shortly afterwards, he conceived and produced the Paschal candle stand for the same place. In 2015, he designed and created the ambo for the Sistine Chapel, inaugurated by Pope Francis in January of that year. The conception and creation of these three works were later illustrated and documented in a volume introduced by Vittorio Sgarbi.

Two years later, he designed and produced new liturgical furnishings for the presbytery of the Basilica del Volto Santo in Manoppello, where the Manoppello Image is kept

He is also the author of the large fresco in the baptistery of the new Parrocchia di San Giuseppe Artigiano in Avezzano. For the same city, between 2020 and 2024, he created the elements of the presbytery of the Cathedral of Saint Bartholomew and the installation Fragmenta lacus, dedicated to Fucino Lake and to the victims of road accidents.

== Main works ==
- Baptismal font for the Sistine Chapel, Vatican City, 2012
- Paschal candle stand for the Sistine Chapel, Vatican City, 2013
- Pictorial works on the facade of Liceo Classico Torlonia, Avezzano, 2014
- Ambo for the Sistine Chapel, Vatican City, 2015
- Paschal candle stand, ambo and seat for the Basilica del Volto Santo, Manoppello, 2016
- Piazza Regina Margherita, Aielli, 2018
- Mural and Albero Cosmico, Aielli, 2018
- Piazza Risorgimento, Aielli Stazione, 2021
- Altar, Paschal candle stand, ambo, cathedra and seat for the liturgical adaptation of the Cathedral of Saint Bartholomew, Avezzano, 2022
- Altar, ambo, Paschal candle stand, cathedra and seat for the liturgical adaptation of the Cathedral of Saint Cetteus, Pescara, 2024
- Fragmenta lacus – fragments of the lake, Avezzano, 2024
- Sculpture "Anna Luce" Award, Christmas Concert, Cathedral of Saint Bartholomew, Avezzano

== Major awards ==
- Cesare Paris Prize, XXIV edition, 2015
