= Jozef Tomko =

Slovak cardinal and archbishop (1924–2022)

His Eminence Jozef Tomko
- President Emeritus of the Pontifical Committee for International Eucharistic Congresses
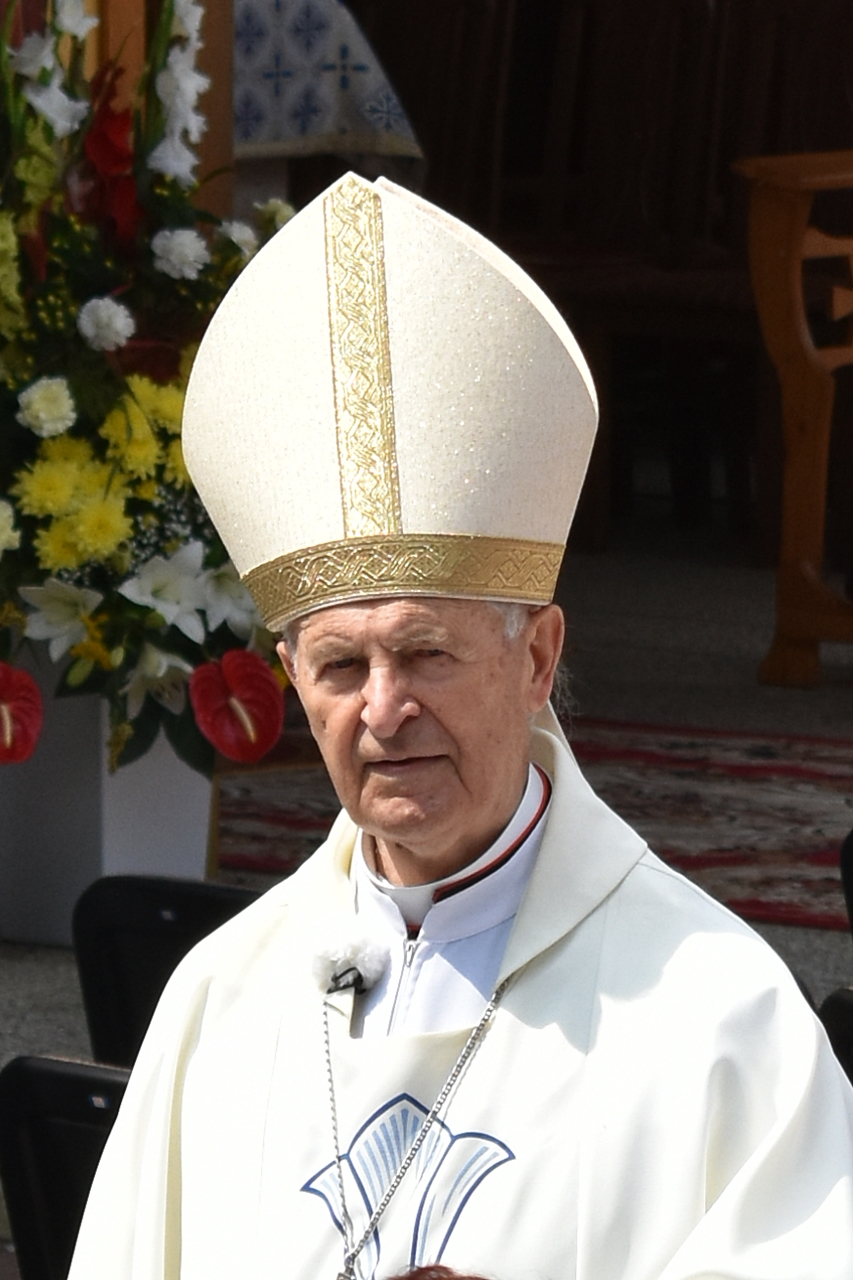
- Tomko in 2018 at Zvir Mountain in Litmanová, Slovakia
- Appointed: 23 October 2001
- Term ended: 1 October 2007
- Predecessor: Edouard Gagnon
- Successor: Piero Marini
- Other post: Cardinal-Priest of Santa Sabina
- Previous posts: Titular Archbishop of Doclea (1979–1985); Secretary General of the Synod of Bishops (1979–1985); Prefect of the Congregation for the Evangelization of Peoples (1985–2001)

Orders
- Ordination: 12 March 1949 by Luigi Traglia
- Consecration: 15 September 1979 by John Paul II
- Created cardinal: 25 May 1985 by John Paul II
- Rank: Cardinal priest

Personal details
- Born: 11 March 1924 Udavské, Czechoslovakia (today Slovakia)
- Died: 8 August 2022 (aged 98) Rome, Italy
- Buried: St Elisabeth Cathedral, Košice
- Denomination: Catholic
- Motto: "Ut ecclesia aedificetur"
- Coat of arms

Styles of Jozef Tomko
- Reference style: His Eminence
- Spoken style: Your Eminence
- Informal style: Cardinal

Jozef Tomko (11 March 1924 – 8 August 2022) was a Slovak prelate of the Catholic Church who held positions in the Roman Curia from 1962 until he retired in 2007. He was prefect of the Congregation for the Evangelization of Peoples from 1985 to 2001 and president of the Pontifical Committee for International Eucharistic Congresses from 2001 to 2007. He was made a cardinal in 1985.

== Biography ==
=== Early life and ordination ===
Jozef Tomko was born 11 March 1924 in Udavské, near Humenné, in Czechoslovakia (now in Slovakia). In 1943 he entered the Theological Faculty of Bratislava. He was sent to Rome to study at the Pontifical Lateran Athenaeum and Pontifical Gregorian University, where he obtained his doctorates in theology, canon law, and social sciences. Tomko was ordained to the priesthood by Archbishop Luigi Traglia on 12 March 1949 in the Archbasilica of St. John Lateran.

=== Pastoral and academic work ===
He continued his studies at the Lateran and Gregorian University while doing pastoral work in Rome and Porto e Santa Rufina until 1979. From 1950 to 1965, he served as vice-rector and later rector of the Pontifical Nepomucenum College. He taught at the International University Pro Deo from 1955 to 1956 as well. During this period, Tomko was actively involved in establishment of the Slovak Institute of Saints Cyril and Methodius in Rome. He visited the Slovak communities in the United States, Canada, and various European countries several times. Tomko for decades regularly addressed Slovak Catholics on Vatican Radio and also on Catholic TV Lux.

=== Roman Curia ===
Tomko was raised to the rank of Privy Chamberlain supernumerary on 5 December 1959, and entered the service of the Roman Curia in 1962, as an adjunct in the Book Censorship Section of the Congregation for the Doctrine of the Faith (CDF). In reference to the more lenient measures taken against dissident theologians, he once remarked, "The electric chair and gas chamber are no more". During the Second Vatican Council (1962–1965) he worked as a consultant for the CDF and later became a member of the Pontifical Commission for the Family. Tomko became an Honorary Prelate of His Holiness on 17 June 1970. He was named Undersecretary of the Congregation for Bishops in 1974. He was a visiting professor at the Gregorian University from 1970 to 1977.

=== Bishop ===
On 12 July 1979, Tomko was appointed Secretary General of the World Synod of Bishops and Titular Archbishop of Doclea by Pope John Paul II. He received his episcopal consecration on the following 15 September from John Paul. On 18 October 1979 he became a member of the Pontifical Commission for the interpretation of the decrees of the Second Vatican Council. Tomko was named Pro-Prefect of the Congregation for the Evangelization of Peoples on 24 April 1985 and Chancellor of the Pontifical Urbaniana University.

=== Cardinal ===
John Paul II created him Cardinal-Deacon of Gesù Buon Pastore alla Montagnola in the consistory of 25 May 1985. He was then named prefect of his congregation. During his tenure, he became a close confidant of Pope John Paul, and served as a special papal envoy to several religious celebrations. He was named a member of the Presynodal Council for Special Synod of Asian Bishops in September 1995. After ten years as a cardinal deacon, he opted for order of Cardinal Priests and assumed the titular church of S. Sabina on 29 January 1996.

=== Eucharistic congresses ===
Tomko was appointed President of the Pontifical Committee for International Eucharistic Congresses on 23 October 2001. In this post, he presided over the Holy See's delegation to the Interreligious Congress in Astana, Kazakhstan, from 23 to 24 September 2003. As papal legate he chaired the 48th International Eucharistic Congress in Guadalajara, Mexico, in October 2004.

Upon the death of John Paul II on 2 April 2005, Tomko and all major Vatican officials automatically lost their positions. He was confirmed as president of International Eucharistic Congresses by Pope Benedict XVI on 21 April. Tomko retired as president on 1 October 2007.

=== Later work ===
Pope Benedict XVI established a Commission of Cardinals to investigate leaks of reserved and confidential documents on television, in newspapers, and in other communications media. It first met on 24 April 2012. Cardinal Herranz served as the chair and the other members were Cardinals Tomko and Salvatore De Giorgi.

At the papal inauguration of Pope Francis on 19 March 2013, Tomko was one of the six cardinals who made the public act of obedience on behalf of the College of Cardinals to the new pope. (Note: The other five cardinals were Giovanni Battista Re, Tarcisio Bertone, Joachim Meisner, Renato Raffaele Martino and Francesco Marchisano. Re and Bertone represented the cardinal bishops; Martino and Marchisano represented the cardinal deacons; and Meisner and Tomko represented the cardinal priests.)

In February 2015 he attended the consistory of cardinals on issues of reform of the Roman Curia.

Tomko became the oldest living member of the College of Cardinals upon the death of Cardinal Albert Vanhoye on 29 July 2021.

Tomko died in Rome on 8 August 2022, at the age of 98. He had recently suffered a spinal injury, and was further weakened from COVID-19 complications. On 16 August 2022, he was buried, per his wishes, in the Cathedral of St. Elisabeth of Hungary in Košice.

== Selected works ==
- Light of Nations (Rome 1972)
- On Missionary Roads, 2007, ISBN 978-1586171650

== Honours ==
- Grand-Croix de l'Ordre de la Couronne de Chene (Luxembourg 1988)
- Grand Cross (or 1st Class) of the Order of the White Double Cross (1995)
- Grand Cruz de la Orden del Libertador San Martín, Argentina (Buenos Aires 1999).
- The Catholic University of Ruzomberok awarded Cardinal Tomko the honorary title of Doctor Honoris Causa on 26 April 2006.
- Honorary doctorate awarded by the Faculty of Medicine of Pavol Jozef Safarik University in Kosice for contribution to the development of culture, education and humanity in Slovakia, (11 December 2001)
- The Golden Plaque of the Ministry of Foreign and European Affairs of the Slovak Republic (2009)

== Notes ==
Catholic Church titles
Position created	Adjunct Secretary of the International Theological Commission; 1969–1971	Succeeded by Jozef Zlatňanský
Preceded by Goffredo Mariani	Undersecretary of the Congregation for Bishops; 21 December 1974 – 12 July 1979	Succeeded by Marcello Costalunga
Preceded by Władysław Rubin	Secretary General of the Synod of Bishops; 12 July 1979 – 24 April 1985	Succeeded by Jan Pieter Schotte
Preceded by Egano Righi-Lambertini	— TITULAR — Titular Archbishop of Doclea; 12 July 1979 – 25 May 1985	Succeeded by Pier Luigi Celata
Preceded by Dermot Ryan	Prefect of the Congregation for the Evangelization of Peoples; 24 April 1985 – 9 April 2001	Succeeded by Crescenzio Sepe
Titular church established	Cardinal Deacon of Gesù Buon Pastore alla Montagnola; 25 May 1985 – 29 January 1996	Succeeded by Velasio De Paolis
Office created	President of the Interdicasterial Commission for Consecrated Religious; 18 March 1989 – 9 April 2001	Succeeded by Crescenzio Sepe
Preceded by Gabriel-Marie Garrone	Cardinal Priest of Santa Sabina; 29 January 1996 – 8 August 2022	Vacant
Preceded by Édouard Gagnon	President of the Pontifical Committee for International Eucharistic Congresses; 23 October 2001 – 1 October 2007	Succeeded by Piero Marini
Records
Preceded by Albert Vanhoye	Oldest living cardinal 29 July 2021 – 8 August 2022	Succeeded by Alexandre do Nascimento
