= Master of ceremonies =

Lead presenter at an event before an audience

A master of ceremonies (MC or emcee) is in charge of ceremonies, staged events, conferences, conventions, or performances such as parties. They are responsible for introducing speakers and performers as well as making announcements.

The term is earliest documented in the Catholic Church since the 5th century, where the master of ceremonies is an official of the Papal Court responsible for the proper and smooth conduct of the elaborate rituals involving the pope and the sacred liturgy. Today, the MC is often the person who presents performers, speaks to the audience, entertains people, runs the award ceremony, and generally keeps an event moving. This is the case in the entertainment industry, for example in reference to television game show hosts, as well as in contemporary hip-hop and electronic dance music culture.

The master of ceremonies is sometimes the protocol officer during an official state function, especially in monarchies. In addition, MCs also exist in various chivalric orders and fraternal orders.

== Name ==
Alternative names include compère (for men), commère (for women), host, presenter, announcer, and microphone controller.

== Catholic Church ==
The office of the Master of Ceremonies itself is very old. The Master of Ceremonies is an official of the Papal household responsible for the proper and smooth conduct of the elegant and elaborate rituals involving the Pope and the sacred liturgy. He may also be an official involved in the proper conduct of protocols and ceremonials involving the Roman Pontiff, the Papal Court, and other dignitaries and potentates. Examples of official liturgical books prescribing the rules and regulations of liturgical celebrations are Cæremoniale Romanum and Cæremoniale Episcoporum. The role of the master of ceremonies is outlined in the Ceremonial of Bishops, Nos. 34–36.

According to the Catholic Encyclopedia, the most ancient ceremonials and rituals of the Catholic Church are the Ordines Romani. Names of Masters of Ceremonies are known since the late Middle Ages (15th century) and the Renaissance (16th century). However, copies of books prescribing the forms of rituals, rites and customs of pontifical ceremonies are known to have been given to Charles Martel in the 8th century. The rules and rituals themselves are known to have been compiled or written by the pontifical masters of ceremonies, dating back to the time of Pope Gelasius I (492–496) with modifications and additions made by Pope Gregory the Great (590–604). It is reasonable to assume that the ceremonials themselves pre-date Gelasius. The duties of the Master of Ceremonies may have developed from the time Emperor Constantine the Great gave the Lateran Palace to the popes (324) or from the time Christianity became the official religion of the Roman Empire (380), and were no doubt influenced by imperial practices, customs and norms. However, documentary evidence from the late Roman period is scarce or lost. The ceremonies and practices of the Byzantine emperors are also known to have influenced the papal court. The accumulation of elaborations and complications since the Renaissance and Baroque eras continued well into the 20th century, until some of the ceremonies (i.e. the court, the rituals and norms) were simplified or eliminated by Pope Paul VI in the 1970s after Vatican II; much of the Renaissance pomp and ceremony has been completely abandoned by the popes of the modern era.

Since the apostolic constitution Pastor bonus of June 28, 1988, the organizing and conducting of liturgies and other religious ceremonies performed by the pope comes under the Office for the Liturgical Celebrations of the Supreme Pontiff. It is headed by a "Master" appointed for a term of five years. Papal masters of ceremonies who assist him in sacred celebrations are likewise appointed to a term of the same length.

According to the General Instruction of the Roman Missal, "It is desirable, at least in cathedrals and in larger churches, to have some competent minister or master of ceremonies, to see to the appropriate arrangement of sacred actions and to their being carried out by the sacred ministers and lay faithful with decorum, order, and devotion." The Master of Ceremonies may also have responsibility for the physical security of the place of worship during the liturgy, and be familiar with appropriate procedures in case of a medical emergency. The Master of Ceremonies coordinates with any concelebrating priests, deacons, altar servers and sometimes the lectors and music ministers to ensure each knows when and how to perform their liturgical functions. At major festivities such as Christmas and Easter, when the liturgies are long and complex, the Master of Ceremonies plays a vital role in ensuring that everything runs smoothly.

The current (2021–2026) papal Master of Pontifical Liturgical Celebrations is Archbishop Diego Giovanni Ravelli, who succeeded Bishop Guido Marini.

== Monarchies ==
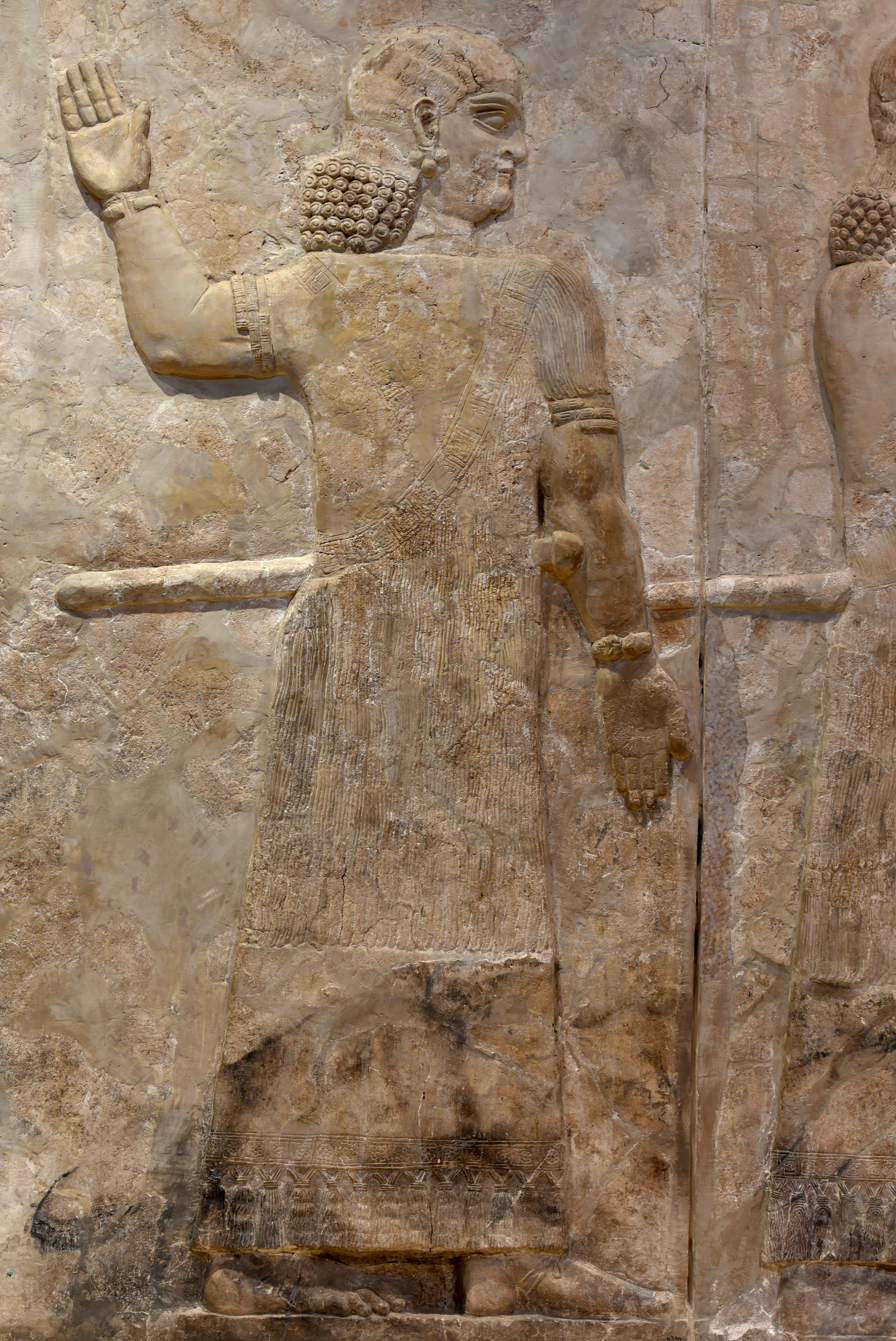
Assyrian master of ceremonies, part of a long tributary scene. Alabaster bas-relief. From Khorsabad, Iraq, c. 710 BCE. Iraq Museum.

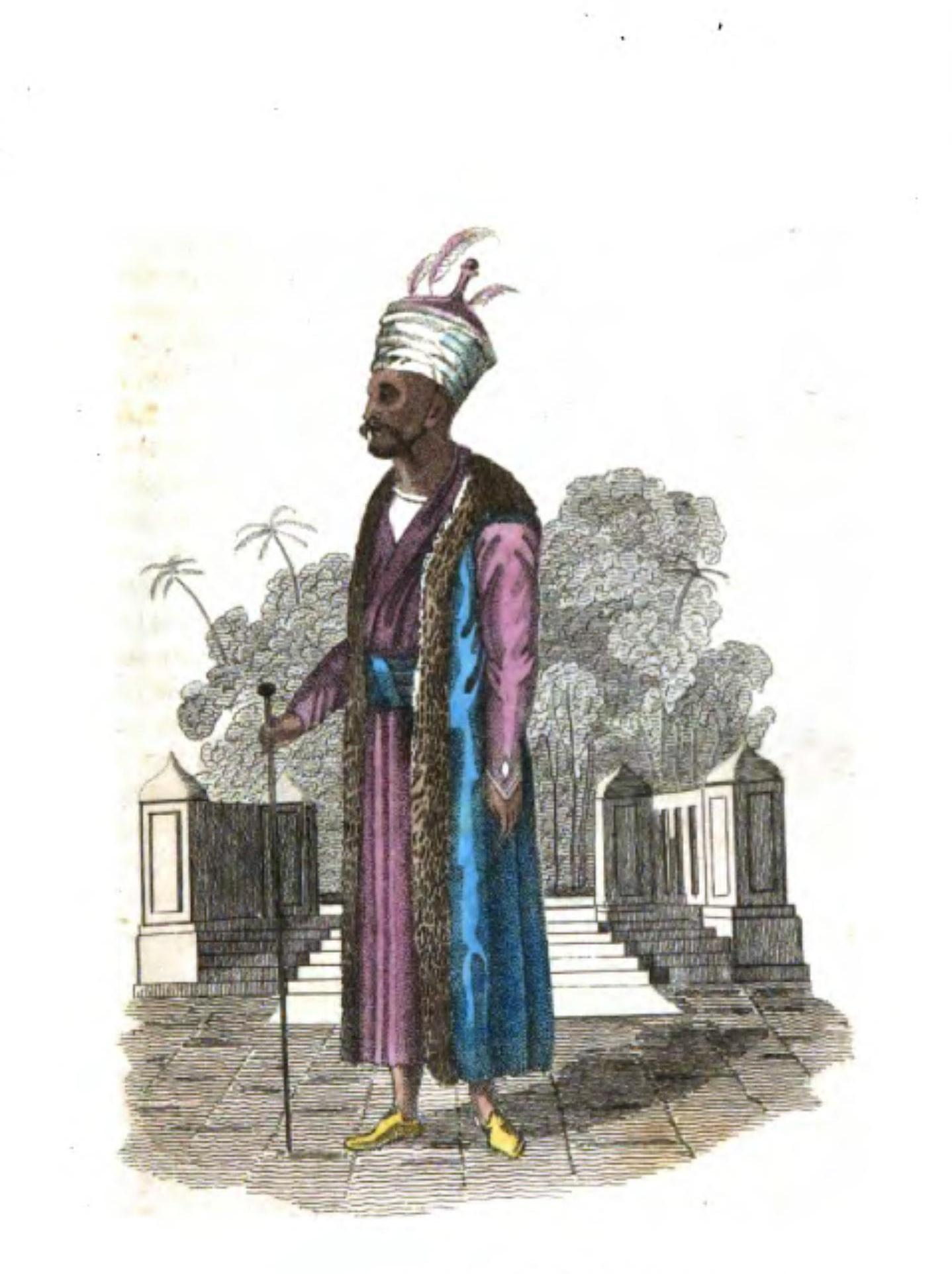
"Master of Ceremonies". from the book Persia by Frederic Shoberl, 1828

Historically certain European royal courts maintained senior offices known as Masters of Ceremonies (or some variant thereof), responsible for conducting stately ceremonies such as coronations and receptions of foreign ambassadors. Examples included:

- Kingdom of Denmark: Ceremonimester (Office currently held by Colonel Lasse Harkjær)
- Spanish Empire: Maestro de Ceremonias
- British Empire: Master of the Ceremonies
- France: Grand Master of Ceremonies
- Japan: Master of Ceremonies
- Russian Empire: see Table of Ranks
- Kingdom of Sweden: Grand Master of the Ceremonies
- Ottoman Empire: Kapıcıbaşı, literally "chief doorkeeper" of the Topkapi Palace

== Orders ==
The function is prevalent in the culture of chivalric orders, as well as in more modern fraternal orders, such as Freemasons and Odd Fellows.

== Corporate ==
Most large corporate and association conferences and conventions use an MC to keep the events running smoothly. This role is sometimes performed by someone inside the group but usually by an outside professional expert MC. Their role could include – introducing and thanking speakers, introducing the theme of the conference, facilitating a panel discussion and interviewing guests.

== Weddings ==
During the wedding reception, the multifaceted responsibility of the Master of Ceremony (MC) is to keep the agenda flowing smoothly by:

- skillfully capturing and maintaining the attention of the wedding guests
- effectively directing their attention to whatever the bride and groom have chosen to include
- keeping the wedding attendees informed so that at any given moment they know what is happening
- comfortably guiding the bride's and groom's friends and family so they know what they are supposed to do to participate

The role of the wedding master of ceremonies incorporates a wide range of skills, and those who serve in this capacity have frequently undergone extensive training in the following areas:

- Delivering applause cues
- Presenting introductions
- Microphone technique
- Posture and stance
- Voice inflection
- Staging

Masters of ceremonies at weddings and private events also ensure the coordination of their event, including liaison with catering staff.

== In music and cultural events ==
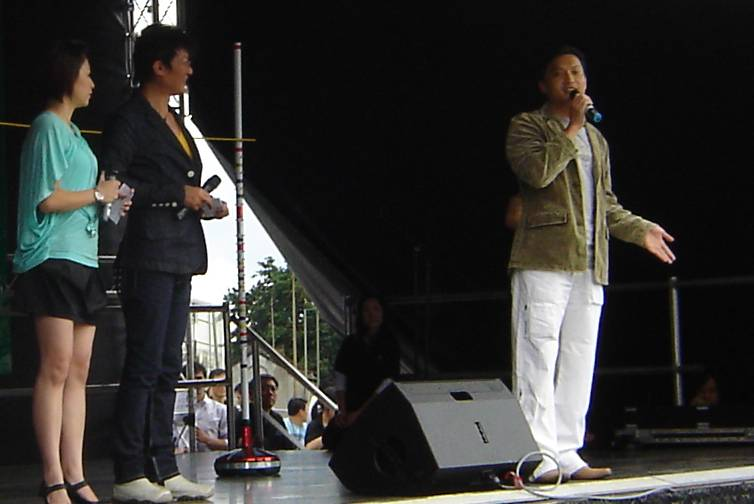
Sunny Chan, seen with local TVB artists, in the UK as guests' compère for TVB-Europe's Happy Family Gala promo-event (2008)

In hip-hop and electronic dance music, MCs are rap artists or performers who perform vocals for their own or other artists' original material. Genres of electronic dance music where MCs perform include house, drum and bass, UK garage and grime.

=== Hip-hop ===
In the late 1970s, the term emcee, MC or M.C. became used for rappers and for their role within hip-hop and culture. Initially, MCs were those who introduced the DJs to the crowd and explained what was taking place during the event. Often these events were parties at locations including clubs or outdoor public spaces. The term is typically used as a term of distinction, referring to an artist with good performance skills. Many rappers have MC in their stage name, such as MC Hammer, MC Lyte, MC Ren, MC Shan, MC Ride, MC Eiht or MC Serch.

=== Comedy clubs ===
In the context of a comedy club, the role of MC is traditionally filled by a "compère". In any comedy show, the compère is the host of the evening's events, but the precise role and responsibilities will vary depending on the country, venue, and style of event. The compère is usually a working comedian, and whilst they may incorporate elements of their regular set, the role broadly requires a greater level of improvisation – creating a sense of place and community, interacting with the audience, dealing with any hecklers, and encouraging them to focus on the other acts. The compère will normally do longer bits at the start of the show and after any interval, and shorter bits between acts. They may also be required to make announcements, such as birthdays, anniversaries, and bar promotions.

=== Country and rockabilly ===
Houston disc jockey Biff Collie MC'd the Philip Morris Country Music Show, a traveling troupe of country music and rockabilly musicians, including Carl Smith, Red Sovine, Goldie Hill, Gordon Terry, Sonny Curtis, and ""Mr. Frantic" Ronnie Self.

== Other ==
The title "Master of Ceremonies" is also known as "Minister of Ceremonies". In the 1940 Disney film Fantasia, Deems Taylor is the film's Master of Ceremonies. In the role-playing game Apocalypse World, the game master is named Master of Ceremonies (MC).
