= Enrico Dante =

Italian Catholic Cardinal (1884–1967)

His Eminence Enrico Dante
- Papal Master of Ceremonies; Cardinal-Priest of Sant'Agata dei Goti
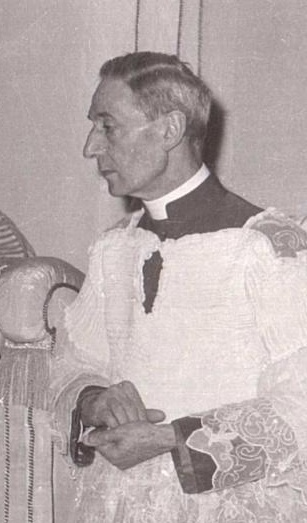
- Appointed: 22 February 1965
- Term ended: 24 April 1967
- Predecessor: John Francis D'Alton
- Successor: Silvio Angelo Pio Oddi
- Previous posts: Prefect of Pontifical Ceremonies (1947–1965); Titular Archbishop of Carpasia (1962–1965); Secretary of the Congregation of Rites (1960–1967)

Orders
- Ordination: 3 July 1910 by Giuseppe Ceppetelli
- Consecration: 21 September 1962 by Pope John XXIII
- Created cardinal: 22 February 1965 by Pope Paul VI
- Rank: Cardinal-Priest

Personal details
- Born: 5 July 1884 Rome, Kingdom of Italy
- Died: 24 April 1967 (aged 82) Rome, Italy
- Denomination: Roman Catholic
- Coat of arms

Styles of Enrico Dante
- Reference style: His Eminence
- Spoken style: Your Eminence
- Religious style: Cardinal
- Informal style: Cardinal
- See: Sant'Agata dei Goti

Enrico Dante (5 July 1884 – 24 April 1967) was an Italian cardinal of the Roman Catholic Church. He served as Papal Master of Ceremonies from 1947 until his death, and was elevated to the cardinalate in 1965.

His face became very familiar after assisting the popes at their Masses and other ceremonies for nearly twenty years.

== Biography ==
The coat of arms of Cardinal Dante

Enrico Dante was born in Rome to Achille Dante, a devoted supporter of Giuseppe Garibaldi, and Zenaide Ingegni (died 1892). He had two sisters, and a brother who was a missionary in Brazil. Dante studied in Paris and then at Collegio Capranica in Rome. He also attended the Pontifical Gregorian University, from where he received doctorates in philosophy, theology, canon law and civil law; from the Sacra Rota Romana he obtained a diploma of avvocato rotale.

He was ordained to the priesthood on 3 July 1910 by Patriarch Giuseppe Ceppetelli. Dante taught philosophy at the Pontifical Urbaniana University from 1911 to 1928, and then theology until 1947. He began work as an official in the Apostolic Penitentiary in 1913, and became a member of the College of Pontifical Ceremoniers on 25 March 1914. In 1923, along with his duties as a papal ceremoniere, he entered the Congregation of Rites, of which he was later named substitute on 28 September 1930. He was raised to the rank of domestic prelate of his holiness and undersecretary of the Congregation of Ceremonies in 1943.

Appointed prefect of Pontifical Ceremonies on 13 June 1947, Dante was entrusted with assisting and overseeing the sacred functions performed by the pope and other cardinals. In 1953, he assisted in the consistory of Pope Pius XII, whom he deeply revered. In 1959 he was named pro-secretary of the Congregation of Rites, and later its secretary in 1960. In 1960, Time magazine named him a likely candidate for membership in the College of Cardinals, a speculation, which was prompted by the announcement of Pope John XXIII, that he had named three persons in pectore cardinals. As papal ceremoniere, he participated in the conclaves of 1914, 1922, 1939, 1958, and 1963, and the coronations of Popes Benedict XV, Pius XI, Pius XII, John XXIII, and Paul VI.

On 25 January 1959, he organised the extraordinary consistory which announced the Vatican council. On 28 August 1962, he was appointed Titular Archbishop of Carpasia. Dante received his episcopal consecration on the following 21 September from John XXIII himself, with Archbishops Francesco Carpino and Pietro Parente serving as co-consecrators, in the Lateran Basilica. He then attended the Second Vatican Council (1962–1965), of whose reforms Dante did not approve.

Dante was created Cardinal-Priest of Sant'Agata dei Goti by Pope Paul VI in the consistory of 22 February 1965. During the ceremony, Pope Paul accidentally bestowed the biretta of Lawrence Shehan on Dante, causing the biretta to fall over his ears.

He died in the early morning of 24 April 1967 in Rome, at age 82, and was buried in his cardinalatial church of S. Agata dei Goti.

== Gallery ==
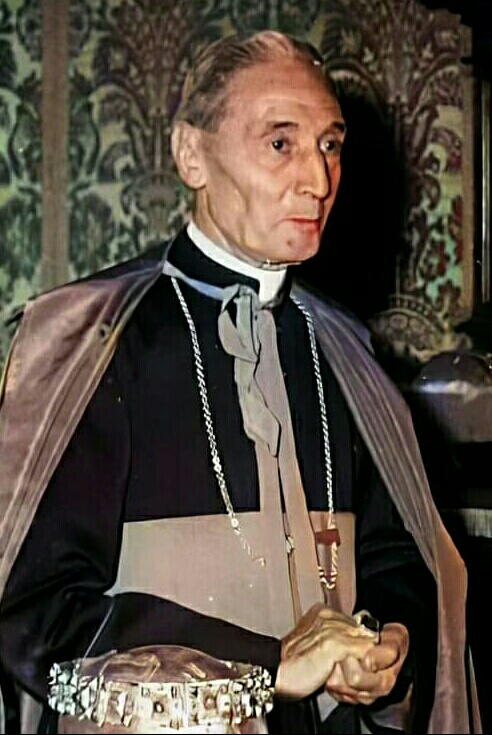

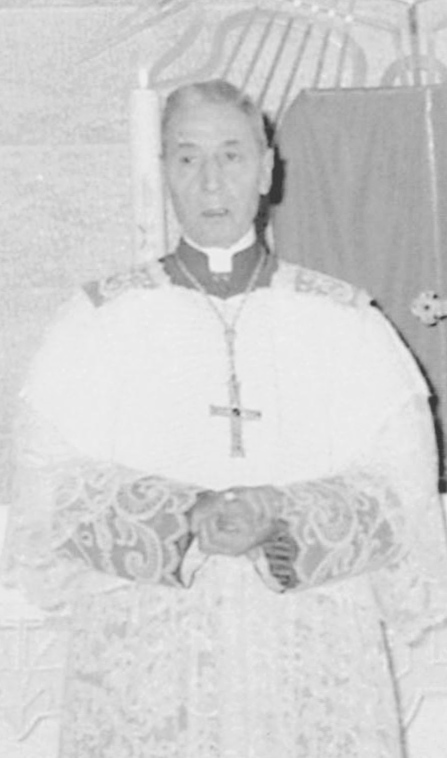

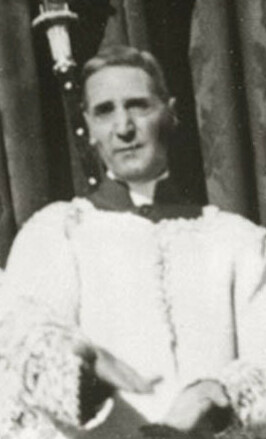

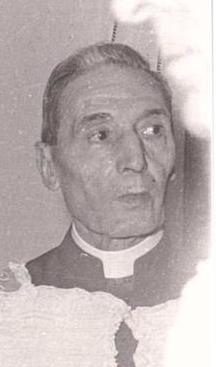

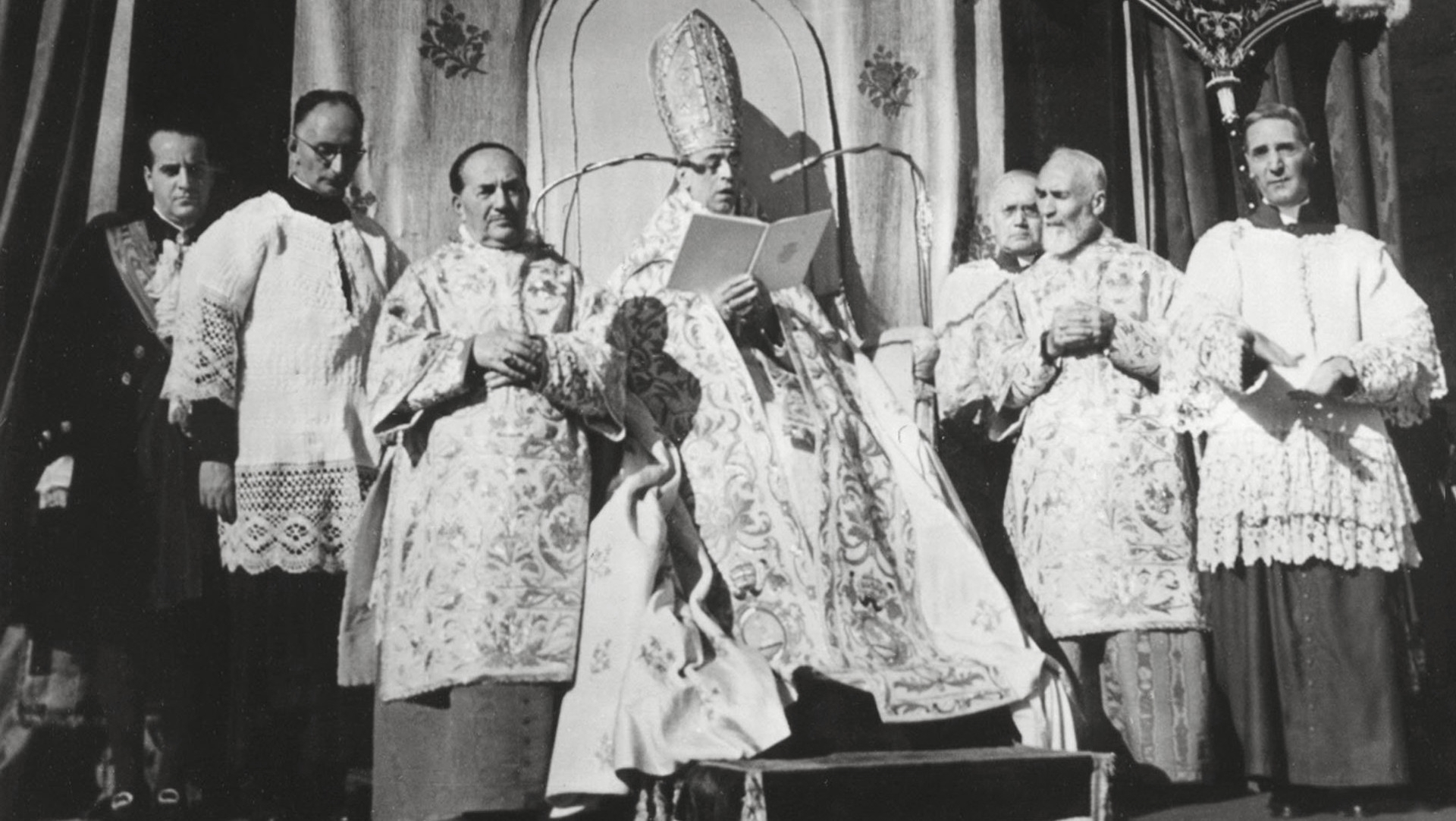

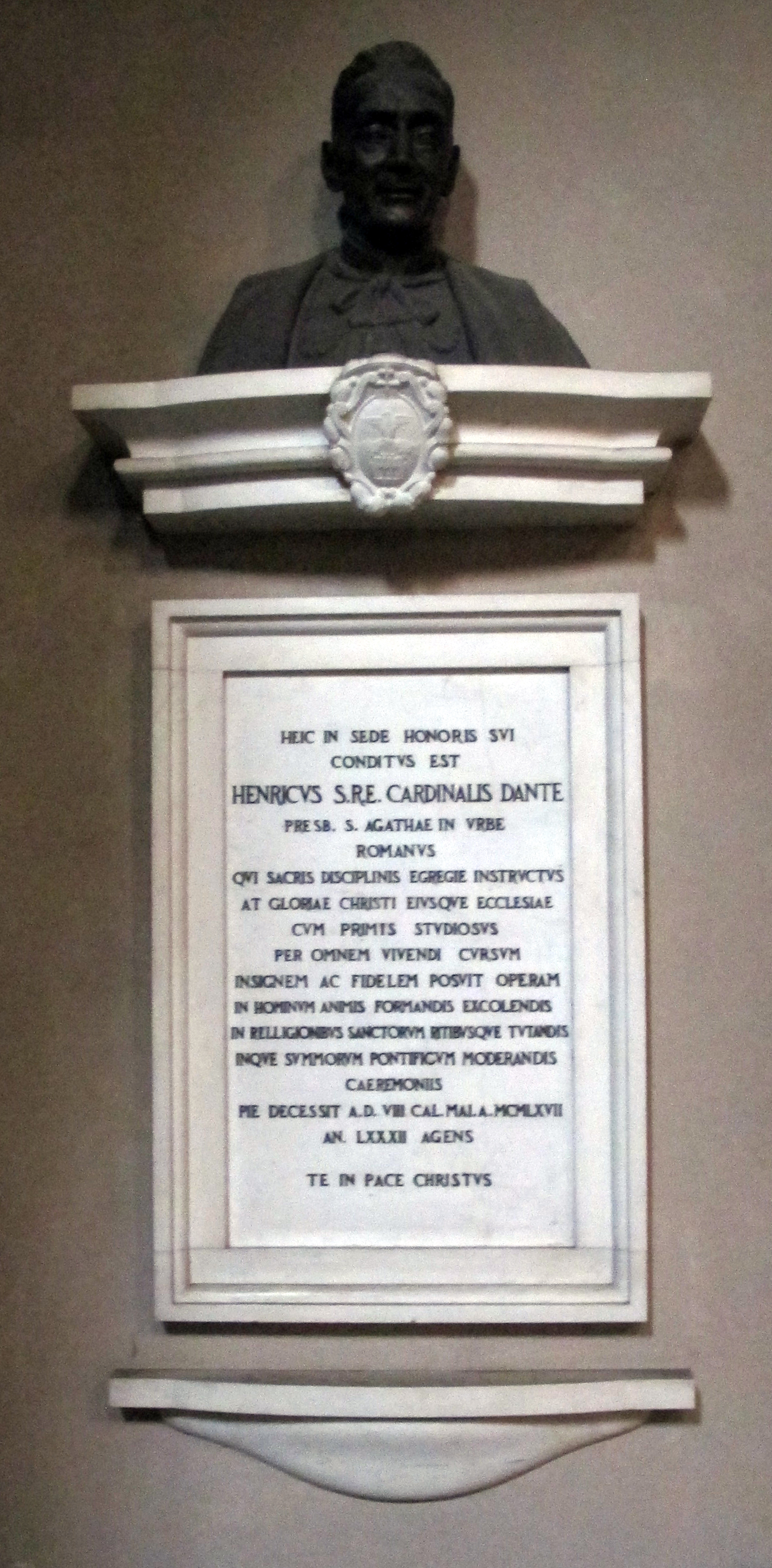
Tomb in Sant'Agata dei Goti (Rome)

Preceded by Carlo Respighi	Prefect of Pontifical Ceremonies; 13 June 1947 – 21 February 1965	Succeeded by Annibale Bugnini (delegate)
