= Pescina Cathedral =

Church building in Pescina, Italy

Coordinates: 42.0269°N 13.6625°E

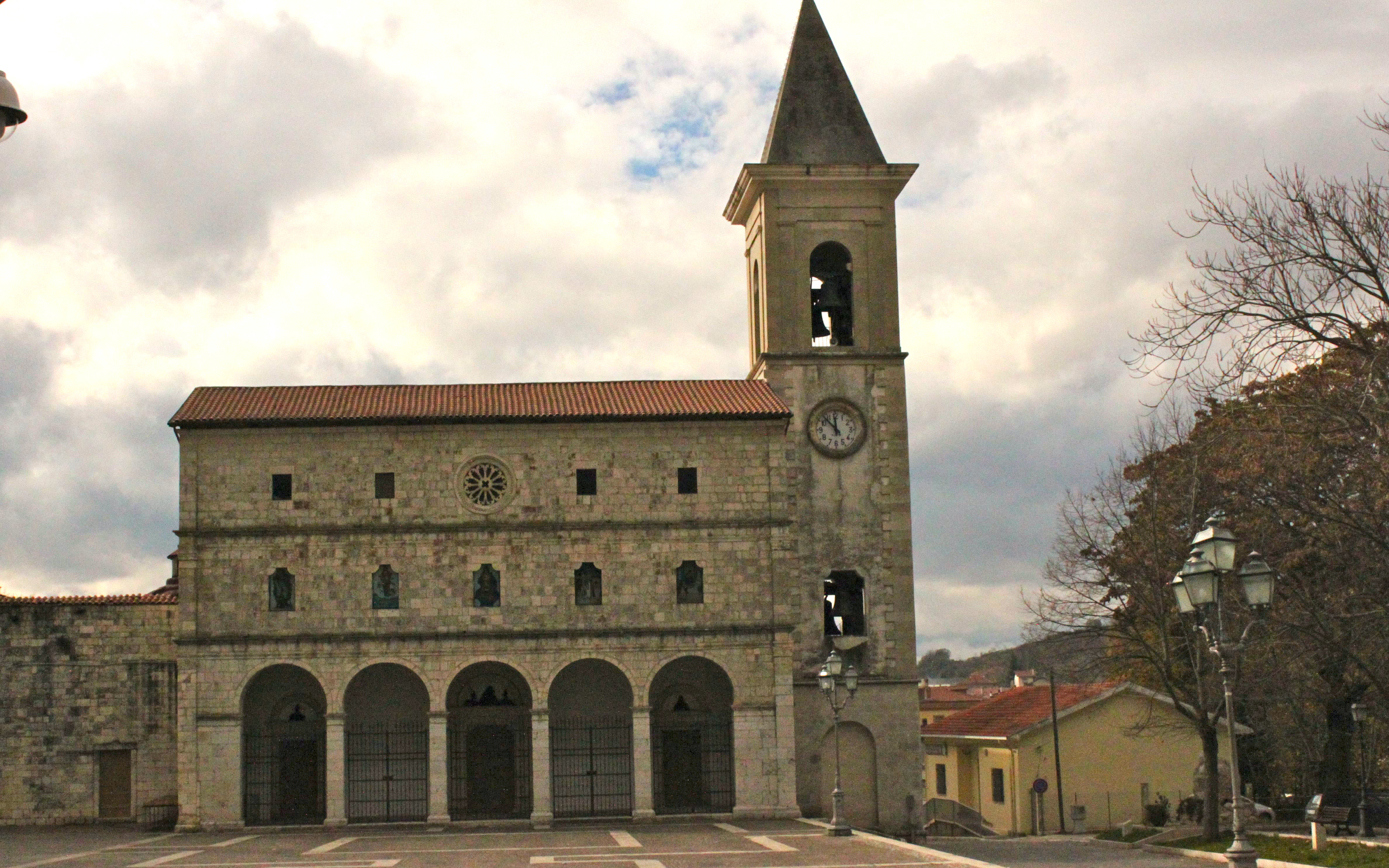
Pescina Cathedral

Pescina Cathedral (Italian: Duomo di Pescina; Concattedrale di Santa Maria delle Grazie) is a Roman Catholic cathedral in Pescina, Abruzzo, Italy, dedicated to the Blessed Virgin Mary under the title of "Saint Mary of the Graces".

From the late 16th century it was the episcopal seat of the Diocese of Marsi, replaced in 1924 by the Diocese of Avezzano, when the episcopal seat was transferred to Avezzano Cathedral, since when Pescina Cathedral has been a co-cathedral of the new diocese.

== History and description ==
The cathedral was built in the 15th century. From 1526 the crypt has housed the relics of Blessed Berardo dei Marsi. In 1915 it was damaged by the earthquake in Avezzano and again during World War II, after the end of which it was restored.

The church itself blends various architectural styles. The Renaissance façade is decorated with a large rose window. The base is decorated with a porch and three portals. The interior has three naves, Renaissance and Baroque, and retains some medieval frescoes. The bell tower is a large three-storey tower, which houses an ancient bell, dedicated to Berardo dei Marsi.
