= Avezzano Cathedral =

Church building in Avezzano, Italy

Coordinates: 42.03409°N 13.42699°E

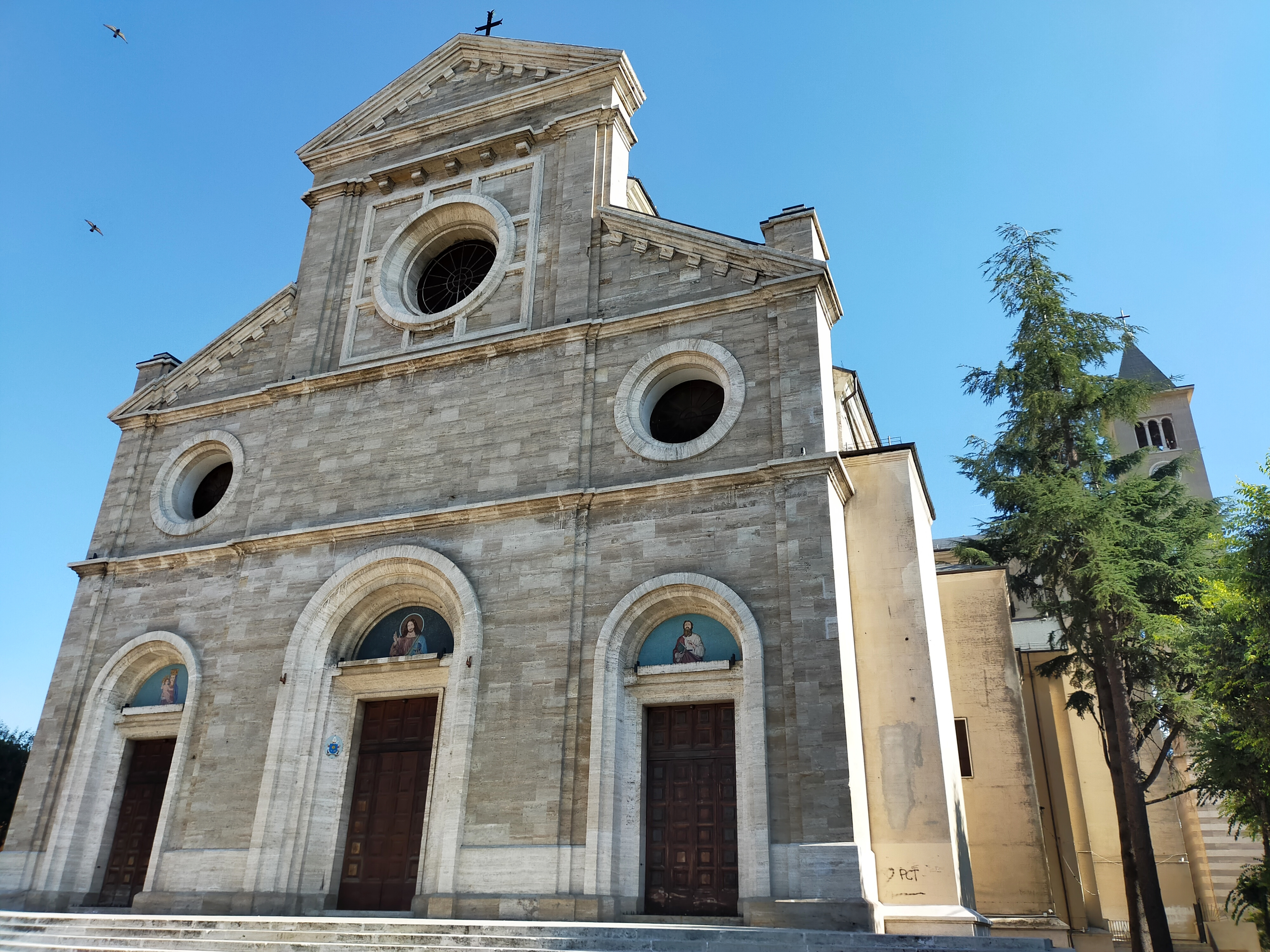
Avezzano Cathedral photographed for Wiki Loves Monuments (2023)

Avezzano Cathedral (Italian: Cattedrale di Avezzano; Cattedrale di San Bartolomeo) is a Roman Catholic cathedral dedicated to Saint Bartholomew in Avezzano, Abruzzo, Italy. There have been churches on the site since the 11th century but earthquakes have repeatedly destroyed them; the present cathedral dates from after the great earthquake of 1915.

Since 1924 the cathedral has been the episcopal seat of the Diocese of Avezzano, replacing the former Diocese of Marsi and its episcopal seat at Pescina Cathedral, which has since then been a co-cathedral in the new diocese.

== History ==
There have been at least four churches dedicated to the apostle Bartholomew built in the history of the city of Avezzano. All of them have had to contend with the earthquakes that have devastated the area.

An ancient church likely originally dedicated to St. Anthony the Abbot and later to St. Bartholomew was built around the year 1000. During the 12th century, this building received from the King of Sicily, William II, the title of royal chapel.

The church, partially destroyed by the earthquake of 1349, was rebuilt and enlarged in Renaissance style in the 16th century. In 1572, it received the title of collegiate church. The 16th century structure was seriously damaged by the earthquakes of 1654 and 1703. Rebuilt afterwards, it was completely destroyed in the 1915 Avezzano earthquake.

In 1930, work on the new building, located in a different position in the center of the city, was initiated by the Bishop of Marsi Pio Marcello Bagnoli, engineer Rodolfo Stoelcker, and architect Sebastiano Bultrini. However, the project stalled due to lack of funds. After Benito Mussolini visited Avezzano on August 11, 1938 the funds needed to continue were found, and construction of the church was completed in about three years. It was consecrated on January 22, 1942, becoming the mother church of its diocese, the Diocese of Marsi, whose chair had been transferred to Avezzano in 1924 with the bull Quo aptius of Pope Pius XI.

The new cathedral was damaged by aerial bombardment in 1944, but has since been restored.

== Description ==
=== Exterior ===
The modern building has a travertine façade in the Neo-Renaissance style with three entryways in front. Above the entryways are mosaics, the central one depicting Jesus with the other two each depicting one of the two patron saints of the city, St. Bartholomew and the Madonna di Pietraquaria. On the side of the cathedral bordering the Via Guglielmo Marconi stands the campanile, the tallest in the city.

=== Interior ===
The cathedral has a cruciform layout with three naves divided by pillars and illuminated by three rose windows and the windows of the cupola. Above the arches, cornices have been added in the restoration undertaken after the damage from the World War II bombardment. All the naves haves apses, but only the central one, fashioned with white stone from a nearby mountain, extends from the perimeter of the church. In the chancel is the pipe organ, which was built in 1975 by the Pontificia Fabbrica d'organi Comm. Giovanni Tamburini. Elements of the presbytery, including the main altar, the ambon, and the candleholder for the Paschal candle, were built in 2020 by the artist Alberto Cicerone using Carrara marble, with Capodimonte porcelain for the floral decorations.

== See also ==
- Catholic Church in Italy
