= Carlo Respighi =

Catholic Priest and Papal Master of Ceremonies

The Right Reverend Monsignor Carlo Respighi
- Papal Master of Ceremonies; Protonotary Apostolic
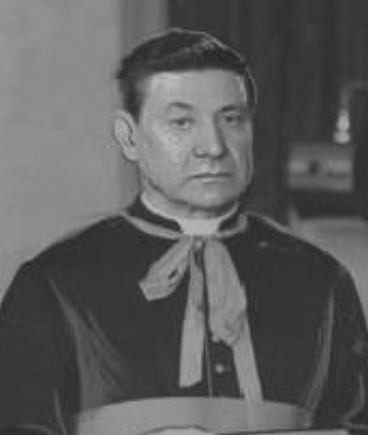
- Church: Roman Catholic Church
- See: Rome
- Appointed: 1918
- Term ended: 6 June 1947
- Predecessor: Francesco Riggi
- Successor: Enrico Dante
- Other posts: Canon of the Archbasilica of St. John Lateran; Rector of the Basilica of Santi Quattro Coronati

Orders
- Ordination: 1895

Personal details
- Born: 18 November 1873 Rome, Italy
- Died: 6 June 1947 (aged 73) Papal Apartments, Vatican City
- Buried: Basilica of Santi Quattro Coronati, Rome
- Denomination: Roman Catholic
- Parents: Lorenzo Respighi (Father); Pietro Respighi (Uncle)
- Education: Almo Collegio Capranica; Pontifical Gregorian University

Carlo Respighi (November 18, 1873 – June 6, 1947), was an Italian priest, Protonotary Apostolic and Papal Master of Ceremonies from 1918 until his death in 1947.

== Biography ==
Carlo Respighi was born in Rome at the Torre del Campidoglio, the son of renowned astronomer Lorenzo Respighi and nephew of Cardinal Pietro Respighi, former Vicar General of the Diocese of Rome and Archpriest of Sthe Archbasilica of St. John Lateran.

Respighi's priestly vocation thus developed in contact with the memory of the first Christian martyrs.

As a child he often accompanied Giovanni Battista de Rossi, the master of Christian archaeology, a close friend of the Respighi family and who lived at the foot of the Capitoline ramp, on his visits to the catacombs.

He was a student at the Almo Collegio Capranica from 1890 to 1896 and had as fellow students the future cardinals Benedetto Aloisi Masella, Luigi Maglione, Francesco Marchetti Selvaggiani, Clemente Micara, as well as Eugenio Pacelli, later Pope Pius XII.

He attended the Pontifical Gregorian University and was ordained a priest in 1895.

An expert in Gregorian music, he already stood out in 1899 for his studies on Palestrina's Graduale Romanum.

In 1902 he founded, together with the Jesuit Angelo De Santi, the magazine Rassegna Gregoriana, which he directed until 1914.

As early as 1899 he was a member, as a supernumerary, of the College of Pontifical Masters of Ceremonies.

He became undersecretary of the Sacred Ceremonial Congregation, a position he held until 1918, and secretary of the Commission of Music and Sacred Chant of the Sacred Congregation of Rites.

He participated the 1914 Papal Conclave as the Master of Ceremonies, where Pope Benedict XV was elected.

On 29 May 1917 he was appointed Protonotary Apostolic with the task of the future succession of Francesco Riggi, prefect of papal ceremonies since 10 September 1895, whom he succeeded the following year.

More than thirty years, between 1918 and 1947, as Master of the Papal Ceremonies, he coordinated and directed numerous rites, then extraordinarily complex, relating to three Supreme Pontiffs such as Benedict XV, Pius XI, and Pius XII.

On the papal coronation of Pope Pius XII, Mons. Respighi was caught into camera that he irritated with unknown reasons during the part of papal blessing.

Aside being a Papal Master of Ceremonies, Respighi is a Rector of the Basilica of Santi Quattro Coronati in the Lateran, on 22 December 1935 he was appointed canon of the Archbasilica of St. John Lateran.

On Friday, June 6, 1947, at around 9:35 a.m. Carlo Respighi died unexpectedly due to the sudden heart attack in his private residence inside the Papal Apartments. He was 73.

The day before his death, he had assisted Pius XII at the Holy Mass celebrated for the first communion of the Pope's great-grandnephew and the children of members of the diplomatic corps.

== Gallery ==
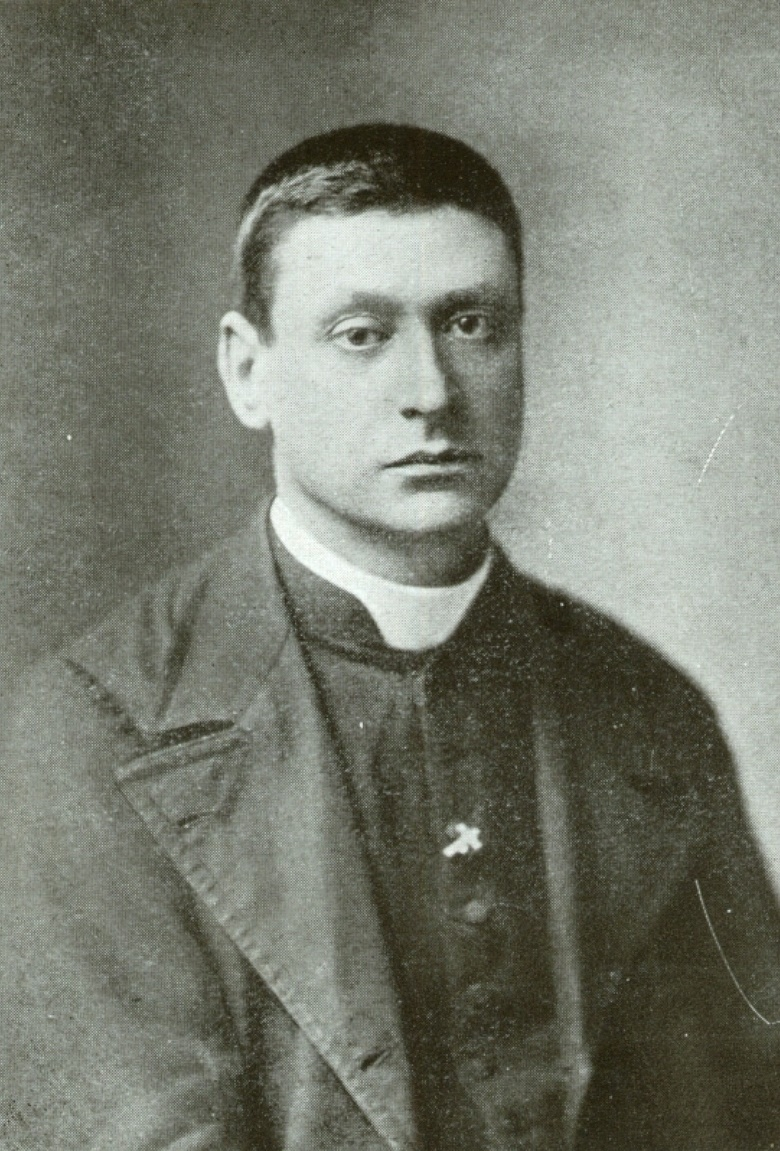
Monsignor Carlo Respighi when he was young.

== See also ==
- Office for the Liturgical Celebrations of the Supreme Pontiff

Preceded by Francesco Riggi	Prefect of Pontifical Ceremonies; 1918 – 6 June 1947	Succeeded by Enrico Dante
