= Berardo dei Marsi =

Saint Berardo dei Marsi
- Bishop of Marsi
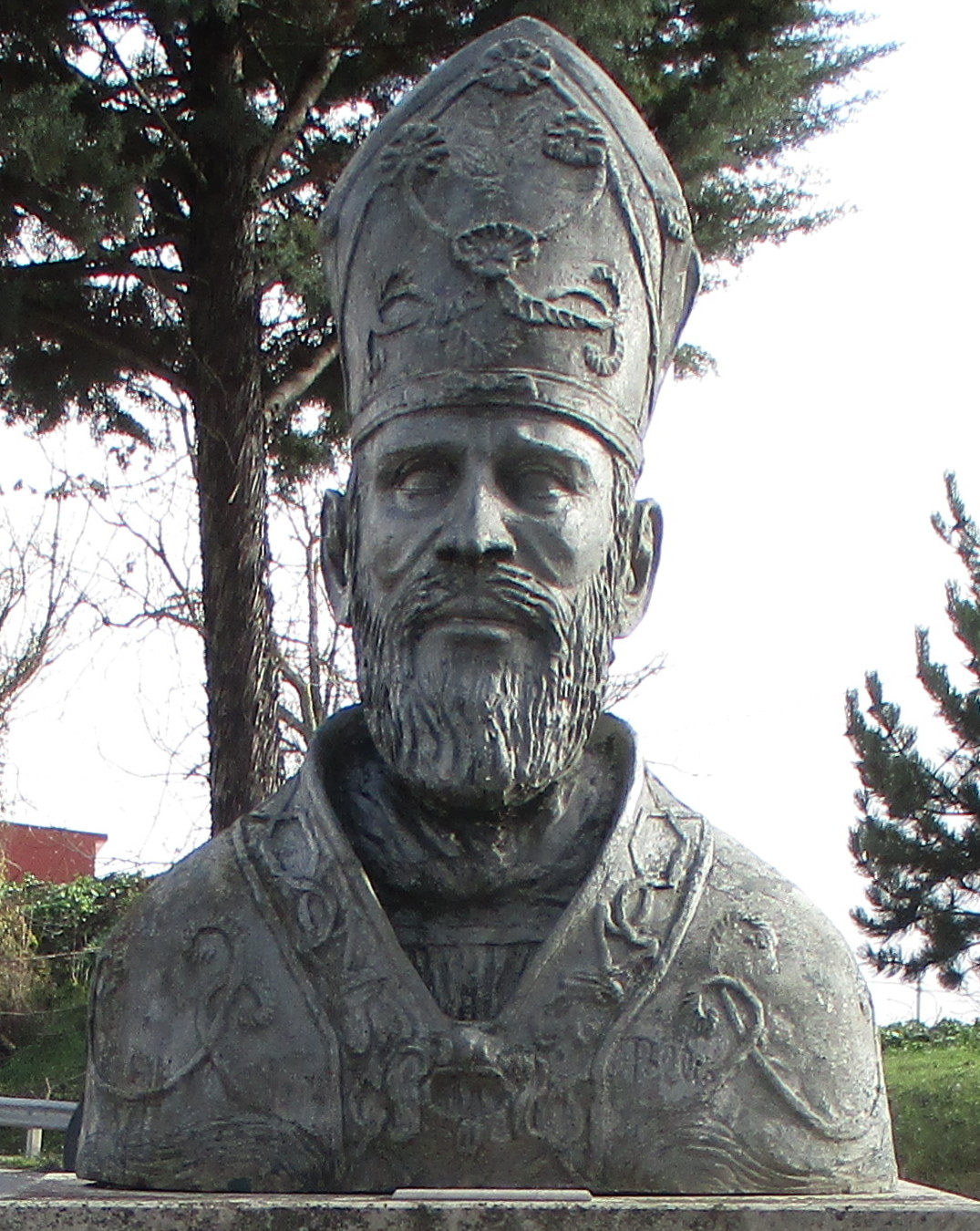
- Berardo dei Marsi busto Celano
- Diocese: Marsi
- See: Marsi
- In office: 1113 – 3 November 1130
- Other post: Cardinal-Priest of San Crisogono (1100-1130)
- Previous post: Cardinal-Deacon of San Adriano al Foro (1099-1100)

Orders
- Consecration: 1110
- Created cardinal: 1099 by Pope Paschal II
- Rank: Cardinal-Priest

Personal details
- Born: Berardo dei Marsi; 1079 Colli di Monte Bove, Carsoli, Italy
- Died: 3 November 1130 (aged 51) San Benedetto dei Marsi, Italy

Sainthood
- Feast day: 3 November
- Venerated in: Roman Catholic Church
- Title as Saint: Saint
- Canonized: 10 May 1802 (equipollent); Rome, Papal States by Pope Pius VII
- Attributes: Crozier
- Patronage: Diocese of Avezzano

Saint Berardo dei Marsi (1079 – 3 November 1130) was a Catholic Italian cardinal. He was proclaimed Saint in 1802 through an equipollent canonization as he was deemed to be holy and that miracles were performed through his intercession.

== Biography ==
Berardo dei Marsi was born in 1079 to Berardo and Theodosia. He was the great-uncle of Saint Rosalia. As a child he studied with the canons of the cathedral of Santa Sabina dei Marsi and also studied at Monte Cassino from 1095 to 1102. He became the governor of Campagna after Pope Paschal II appointed him to that position. He also served as an administrator to Campagna at the behest of the pope. The pope also elevated him to the cardinalate in 1099, as a Cardinal-Deacon and he opted for the order of Cardinal-Priest sometime after.

He was appointed as the Bishop of Marsi in 1113, and he proved to be a reformer in his diocese. He battled against simony and pushed for the idea of clerical celibacy.

He died in 1130 and predicted he would die on this day. He gave all his possessions to the poor in his will. He was buried in the cathedral of Santa Sabina and his relics were moved to Santa Maria delle Grazie in 1631.

== Canonization ==
On account of miracles attributed to him and to his personal holiness, Pope Pius VII equipollently canonized him on 10 May 1802 and proclaimed him to be the patron of his diocese.
