= Pontifical Committee for International Eucharistic Congresses =

Part of the Roman Curia of the Roman Catholic Church

The Pontifical Committee for International Eucharistic Congresses is part of the Roman Curia of the Roman Catholic Church. It was erected in 1879 by Pope Leo XIII. Its statutes were last updated by Pope Benedict XVI in 2009.

== Aims ==
The purpose of this committee is "to make ever better known, loved and served, Our Lord Jesus Christ in his Eucharistic Mystery, as centre of the life of the Church and of its mission for the salvation of the world” through the celebration of International Eucharistic Congresses. And to ensure the adequate pastoral preparation of these International Eucharistic Congresses it requests the Episcopal Conferences and Patriarchal Synods to appoint National Delegates, who will be committed to work for the preparation of the Congresses and, where necessary, set up National Eucharistic Committees with the approval and collaboration of the local ecclesiastical authority.

== Presidents and vice-presidents ==
=== Presidents ===
- Opilio Rossi (5 December 1983 – 3 January 1991)
- Edouard Gagnon P.S.S. (3 January 1991 – March 2001)
- Jozef Tomko (23 October 2001 – 1 October 2007)
- Piero Marini (1 October 2007 – 13 September 2021)
- Corrado Maggioni S.M.M. (13 September 2021 – present)

=== Vice-presidents ===
- Sighard Kleiner, O.Cist. (1983–1985)
- Bernardin Gantin (1983–1989)
