= Piero Marini =

Roman Catholic archbishop

His Excellency, the Most Reverend Piero Marini
- President Emeritus of the Pontifical Committee for International Eucharistic Congresses
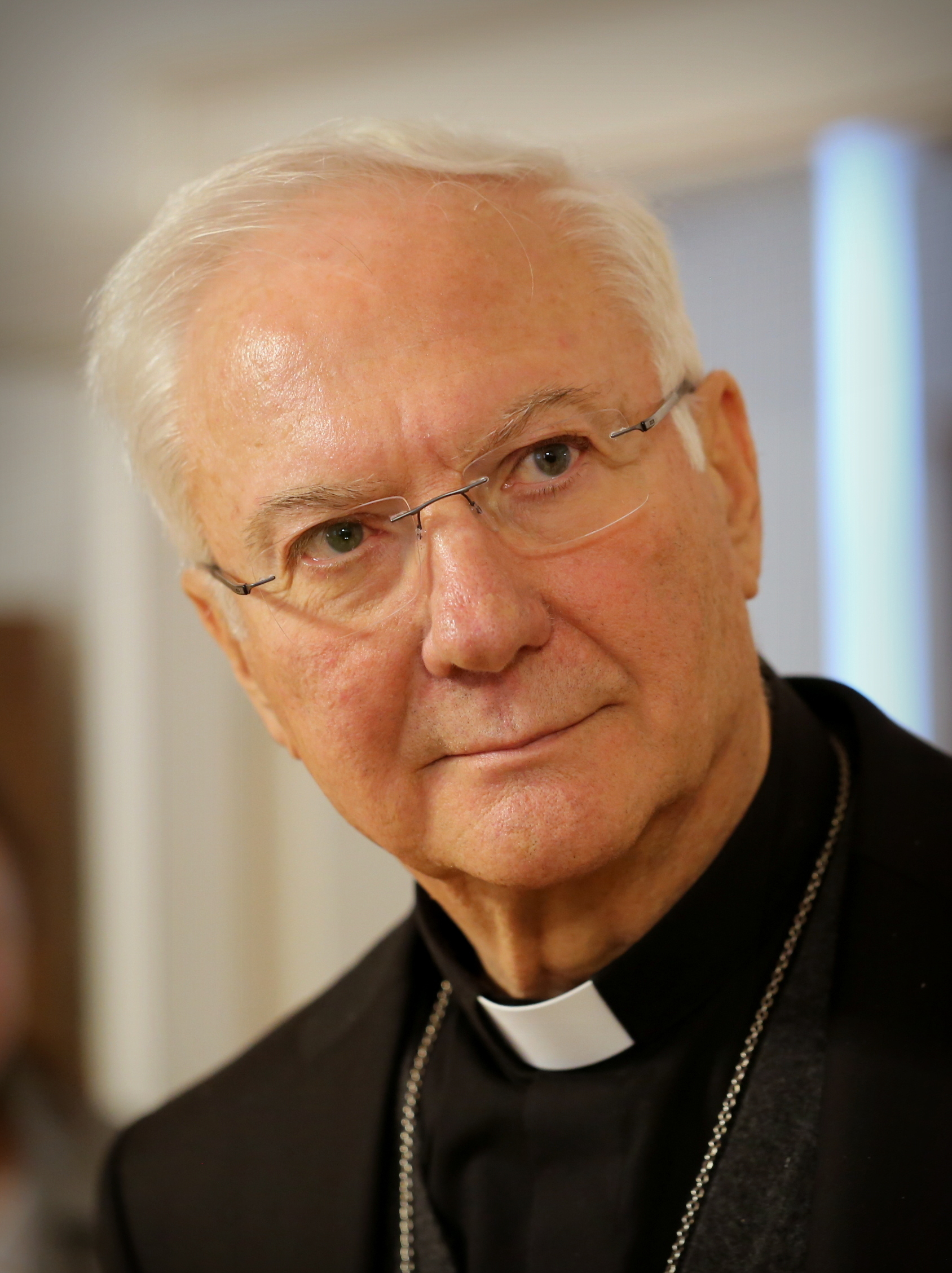
- Marini in 2017
- Diocese: Roman Catholic Diocese of Martirano (titular)
- Appointed: 1 October 2007
- Term ended: 13 September 2021
- Predecessor: Jozef Tomko
- Successor: Corrado Maggioni
- Previous post: Master of Pontifical Liturgical Celebrations (1987–2007)

Orders
- Ordination: 27 June 1965 by Pietro Zuccarino
- Consecration: 19 March 1998 by Pope John Paul II

Personal details
- Born: 13 January 1942 (age 84) Valverde, Kingdom of Italy
- Denomination: Catholic
- Motto: Fons vitae (Font of life)
- Coat of arms

Styles of Piero Marini
- Reference style: The Most Reverend
- Spoken style: Your Excellency
- Religious style: Archbishop

Piero Marini (born 13 January 1942) is a Roman Catholic archbishop who is president emeritus of the Pontifical Committee for International Eucharistic Congresses. For twenty years, he served as Master of Pontifical Liturgical Celebrations, in charge of the Office for the Liturgical Celebrations of the Supreme Pontiff. In that capacity he worked for Popes John Paul II for 18 years and Benedict XVI for two years.

== Biography ==
Marini was born in Valverde, Italy, and was ordained a priest of the Catholic Church on 27 June 1965. He holds a doctorate in liturgy from the Benedictine-run College of Sant'Anselmo.

In 1975, Marini became personal secretary to Archbishop Annibale Bugnini, the chief architect of the liturgical reforms that followed Vatican II. From 1987 to 2007, Marini was the Master of the Office for the Liturgical Celebrations of the Supreme Pontiff, the group responsible for organizing the details of papal liturgies and other celebrations. He was seen at the pope's side in every such celebration. He was appointed Titular Bishop of Martirano on 14 February 1998 and was consecrated on 19 March by Pope John Paul II. On 29 September 2003 he was raised to the rank of archbishop.

On 1 October 2007, after Marini had served twenty years as Master, Pope Benedict appointed him president of the Pontifical Committee for International Eucharistic Congresses. He was confirmed to another five-year term in that post by Pope Francis on 10 March 2015.

Three days after the death of Pope John Paul II in April 2005, Marini published a guide to the rites and decision-making authority during the weeks until the election of a new pope.

In April 2013, in an interview with the Costa Rican newspaper La Nacion, Marini indicated his openness to the idea of same-sex civil unions being recognised by civil law: "In these discussions, it is necessary, for example, to recognize the union of people of the same sex, because there are many couples who suffer because their civil rights are not recognized", but went on to say, "What cannot be recognized is that that couple be a marriage." He also expressed enthusiasm for the newly elected Pope Francis: "It's a breath of fresh air; it's opening a window onto springtime and onto hope. We had been breathing the waters of a swamp, and it had a bad smell. We'd been in a church, afraid of everything, with problems such as Vatileaks and the paedophilia scandals. With Francis we're talking about positive things.... there's a different air of freedom, a church that's closer to the poor and less problematic".

He was confirmed for another five-year term as a member of the Congregation for the Oriental Churches in February 2014 and has headed its committee for liturgy. He was named a member of the Congregation for Divine Worship and the Discipline of the Sacraments in October 2016.

During the night of 30/31 October 2016, he suffered a stroke.

On 18 May 2020, Marini concelebrated Mass with Pope Francis for the 100th anniversary of the birth of John Paul II. The Mass was celebrated ad orientem at John Paul's tomb in St. Peter's Basilica.

== Activity as liturgist ==
Marini promoted Vatican II reforms, including the "simplification of rites that he believes facilitates active participation." He supports the integration of local customs into church rituals. At a celebration he oversaw in 1998, a group of scantily clad Pacific Islanders danced during the opening liturgy of the Synod for Oceania in St. Peter's Basilica; Pope John Paul II's visit to Mexico City in 2002, an indigenous Mexican shaman performed a purification ritual on the pope during Mass.

In July 2007, when Pope Benedict gave broader permission for the celebration of the 1962 Tridentine Mass, Marini said that it "does not intend to introduce modifications into the current Roman Missal nor to express a negative judgement on the liturgical reform desired by the Council" and described it as "a gesture at the service of unity". Marini has said he is "not nostalgic for what he regards as the repetitive nature of the old Mass, neither the exaltation of the celebrant to the detriment of the people of God; and he deplores the marked split between the priest and the assembly."

When leaving his post at the Office of Liturgical Celebrations, he described his relationship with Pope Benedict XVI:

I also express my heartfelt filial gratitude to Pope Benedict XVI who, immediately following his election, chose to confirm me as Master of Papal Liturgical Celebrations. To tell the truth, it was not a completely new experience for me, since I had been his master of ceremonies following his elevation to the cardinalate. For this reason too, from the very start I felt welcomed by Pope Benedict as a son. In him I could see, to my great satisfaction, not only a professor but also a Pope who is an expert in the liturgy. I will never forget the emotion I felt in finding myself alone with him in the Sistine Chapel just after his election, or the emotion I experienced during the rites of the inauguration of his Petrine ministry. These rites remain fixed in my mind and heart, since I consider them the fullest and most successful icon which the liturgy has given of the Church in the wake of the Second Vatican Council.

Marini's study of the Council's liturgical work appeared in English in 2007.

On 7 April 2017, he celebrated Mass in the Roman church where Paul VI first celebrated Mass in the vernacular at the conclusion of the Council fifty years earlier.

Catholic Church titles
Preceded by John Magee	Master of Pontifical Liturgical Celebrations; 17 February 1987 – 1 October 2007	Succeeded by Guido Marini
Preceded by Jozef Tomko	President of the Pontifical Committee for International Eucharistic Congresses; 1 October 2007 – present	Incumbent
