= Édouard Gagnon =

Canadian Roman Catholic cardinal

His Eminence Édouard Gagnon PSS, OC
- Cardinal, President of the Pontifical Council for the Family
- Installed: 7 July 1983
- Term ended: 8 November 1990
- Predecessor: James Knox
- Successor: Alfonso López Trujillo
- Other posts: Cardinal-Priest of St. Marcello, Titular Archbishop of Justiniana
- Previous posts: Bishop of St Paul in Alberta, Cardinal-Deacon of Sant'Elena, Secretary of the Pontifical Council for Social Communications

Orders
- Ordination: 15 August 1940 by Paul-Ernest-Anastase Forget
- Consecration: 25 March 1969 by Emanuele Clarizio
- Created cardinal: 25 May 1985 by Pope John Paul II
- Rank: Cardinal-Priest

Personal details
- Born: January 15, 1918 Port-Daniel, Quebec, Canada
- Died: August 25, 2007 (aged 89) Saint-Sulpice Seminary, Montreal, Quebec, Canada
- Denomination: Roman Catholic
- Motto: Ad obediendum fidei
- Coat of arms

Styles of Édouard Gagnon
- Reference style: His Eminence
- Spoken style: Your Eminence
- Religious style: Cardinal
- Informal style: Cardinal
- See: San Marcello al Corso

Édouard Gagnon, PSS, OC (15 January 1918 – 25 August 2007) was a Canadian Roman Catholic cardinal and President of the Pontifical Council for the Family for 7 years, from 1983 to 1990. He became a cardinal on 25 May 1985.

== Biography ==
Édouard Gagnon was born in Port-Daniel, Quebec, one of 13 children. His mother was part Irish, his father a French Canadian carpenter. In 1921 the family moved to the Hochelaga-Maisonneuve neighborhood in Montreal, where he received his primary education. In 1936 he earned a Bachelor of Arts from the University of Montreal, before entering the major seminary of Montreal, where he received a doctorate degree in theology in 1941. While there, he served as a part-time secretary of the Diocesan Marriage Tribunal. He was ordained on 15 August 1940. He then studied at the University of Laval in Quebec from 1941 to 1944, receiving a doctorate in canon law.

Father Gagnon was admitted to the Society of St Sulpice in 1945. Upon his return to Montreal, he taught moral theology and canon law at the Grand Seminary from 1945 to 1954. He joined the Knights of Columbus in 1950 and was a member of St. Boniface Council 3158 in Manitoba. He was rector of the major seminary of Saint Boniface from 1954 to 1960, and then director of the major seminary in Manizales, Colombia. Gagnon was elected Provincial of the Society of Saint-Sulpice for Canada, Japan and Latin America. During this time, he also acted as a peritus (theologian advisor and consultant) during the Second Vatican Council, especially during the 3rd and 4th sessions (1964-1965). He became secretary of the Pontifical Council for Social Communications in 1966. In June 1968, he was appointed one of the thirty consultors of the Congregation for Catholic Education.

Gagnon was named Bishop of St. Paul, Alberta, on 19 February 1969, and was consecrated on 25 March 1969. In 1972, he was named rector of the Canadian College in Rome. He became Archbishop of the titular see of Justiniana on 7 July 1983. He was then made a Cardinal by Pope John Paul II during the consistory of 25 May 1985.

He held several important posts in the Roman Curia. Gagnon was named President of the Pontifical Council for the Family by Pope John Paul II and he fully supported the prohibition on contraception in Pope Paul VI's encyclical Humanae vitae. He attended the Synod of Bishops in 1985 and in 1987. In 1991, he was appointed President of the Pontifical Committee for International Eucharistic Congresses.

In 1993, he was made an Officer of the Order of Canada. He opposed the legalisation of same-sex marriage in Canada in 2005.

He died on August 25, 2007, in Montreal at the Saint-Sulpice Seminary. The funeral Mass was at Notre Dame Basilica in Montreal. On hearing of his death, Pope Benedict XVI said that Cardinal Gagnon was a "faithful pastor who, with an evangelical spirit, consecrated his life in service to Christ and his Church."

== Special Assignments ==
In 1987 Cardinal Gagnon was given the task of seeking a rapprochement with Archbishop Marcel Lefebvre's traditionalist Society of Saint Pius X. Gagnon conducted interviews with the Archbishop and others and visited institutions belonging to the new Society. Unfortunately, the Archbishop refused the condition that he ordain only one bishop for the Society. The mission ended in failure and Archbishop Lefebvre was excommunicated in 1988, after consecrating four bishops without permission from the Holy See.

== Legacy ==
Cardinal Gagnon lectured at the Pontifical John Paul II Institute for Studies on Marriage and Family at The Catholic University in Washington, D.C. The Edouard Cardinal Gagnon Professorship of Fundamental Theology was created at the Institute by the Knights of Columbus in honorable memory of Cardinal Gagnon.
