= Diego Ravelli =

Italian Catholic archbishop (born 1965)

His Excellency, The Most Reverend Diego Ravelli
- Master of Pontifical Liturgical Celebrations
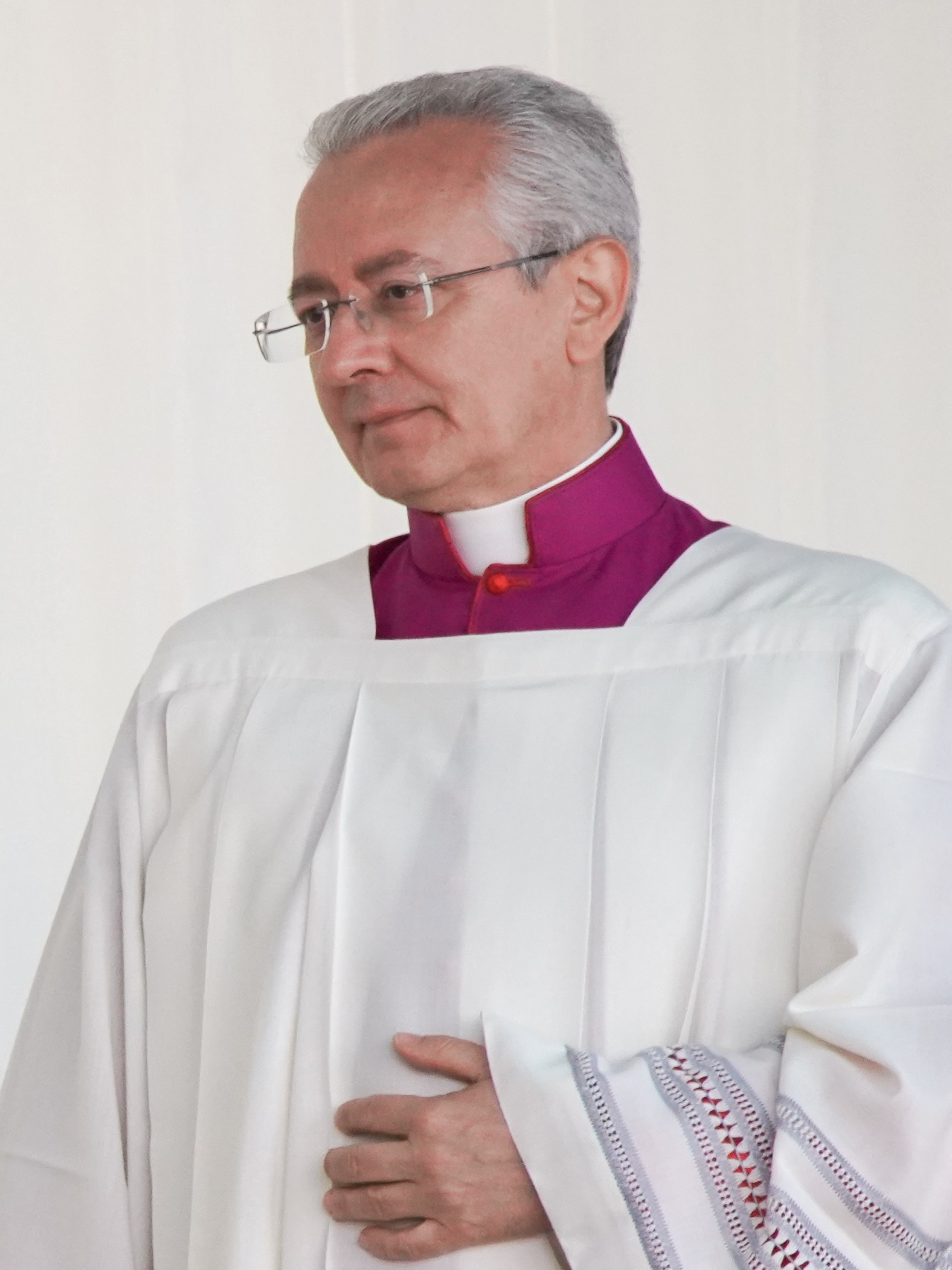
- Ravelli in 2022
- Church: Latin Church
- Appointed: 11 October 2021
- Predecessor: Guido Marini
- Other post: Titular Archbishop of Recanati

Orders
- Ordination: 15 June 1991 by Alessandro Maggiolini
- Consecration: 3 June 2023 by Pietro Parolin, Guido Marini and Konrad Krajewski

Personal details
- Born: Diego Giovanni Ravelli; 1 November 1965 (age 60) Lazzate, Italy
- Denomination: Catholic
- Education: Salesian Pontifical University; Anselmianum
- Motto: Evangelii Gaudium (The joy of the gospel)

Styles of Diego Ravelli
- Reference style: The Most Reverend
- Spoken style: Your Excellency
- Religious style: Archbishop

Diego Giovanni Ravelli (born 1 November 1965) is an Italian prelate of the Latin Church who has worked for the papal household since 1998 and has served as Master of Pontifical Liturgical Celebrations and head of the Pontifical Sistine Chapel Choir since October 2021. He was appointed a titular archbishop in 2023.

== Biography ==
Diego Ravelli was born on 1 November 1965 in Lazzate, Italy. He was ordained a priest for the Public Clerical Association Priests of Jesus Crucified in 1991 and then incardinated in the Suburbicarian Diocese of Velletri–Segni.

In 2000 he obtained a diploma in pedagogical methodology from the Faculty of Educational Sciences at the Salesian Pontifical University in Rome. He earned a doctorate in sacred liturgy at the Liturgical Institute of the Pontifical Athenaeum of Saint Anselm in 2010.

He joined the Office of Papal Charities in 1998 and was named head of that office on 12 October 2003 and served in that post until October 2021. He directed the new annual lottery that raised funds for papal charities by raffling off gifts received by the pope. He was also a chaplain at a spiritual center and assisted at a local parish in Rome.

He worked at the same time for the Office for the Liturgical Celebrations of the Supreme Pontiff, where he was an Assistant Master of Ceremonies. Pope Benedict XVI appointed him a Papal Master of Ceremonies on 25 February 2006, renewing that appointment in 2011. On 11 October 2021, Pope Francis named him Master of Pontifical Liturgical Celebrations and head of the Pontifical Sistine Chapel Choir.

In 2012 he published his academic research, a historical study of the celebration of the feast of the Chair of Saint Peter in the Vatican basilica.

In December 2017, his hometown of Lazzate awarded him its highest honor, the Pila d'Oro.

Following the funeral of Benedict XVI in 2023, Francis requested that Ravelli simplify the Ordo Exsequiarum Romani Pontificis, the liturgical book for papal funerals. This second edition of the text was approved by Francis in April 2024, with Ravelli announcing its publication in November that year. Following the death of Pope Francis on 21 April 2025, these changes were put into effect, which he oversaw, such as the Pope's body being placed inside an open coffin for public viewing, the elimination of the triple coffin, and the rite of the ascertainment of the Pope's death taking place at the chapel of Domus Sanctae Marthae on 21 April 2025.

== Archbishop ==
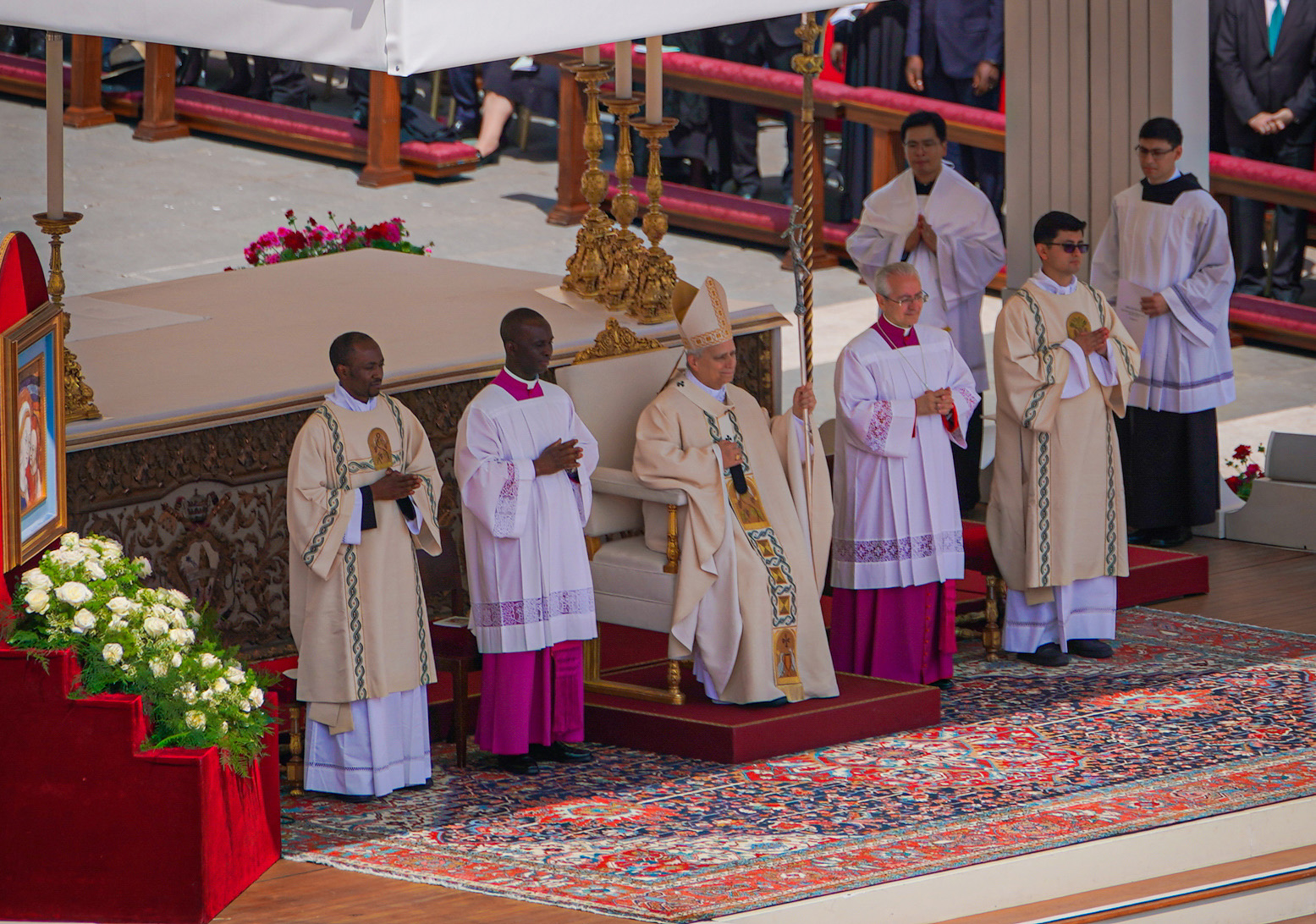
Ravelli to the right of Pope Leo XIV during his inauguration Mass, 2025

On 21 April 2023, Pope Francis named him titular bishop of Recanati with the personal title of archbishop. His episcopal consecration by Cardinal Pietro Parolin with co-consecrators Bishop Guido Marini and Cardinal Konrad Krajewski was held on 3 June 2023 in Saint Peter's Basilica.

As Master of Pontifical Liturgical Celebrations, he assisted in the 2025 papal conclave that elected Pope Leo XIV. He was the cleric to give the emblematic command Extra omnes before he closed the doors of the Sistine Chapel, the moment that marked the commencement of the conclave proper. In accordance with the Apostolic Constitution Universi Dominici Gregis, Ravelli served as notary upon the acceptance of the election of Cardinal Robert Francis Prevost, assuming the name of Pope Leo XIV. He drafted the document certifying the acceptance of the election with the papal name indicated. This document was shared for the first time on the official social media pages of the Office for the Liturgical Celebrations of the Supreme Pontiff and Vatican News.

== Writings ==
- La solennità della cattedra di San Pietro nella Basilica Vaticana: Storia e formulario della Messa (in Italian). Florence: Libreria Studio Bosazzi. 2012. ISBN 978-8873671640. "a manual with a detailed historical component"

Catholic Church titles
Preceded by Guido Marini	Master of Pontifical Liturgical Celebrations; 2021 – present	Incumbent
