= Udavské =

- Municipality
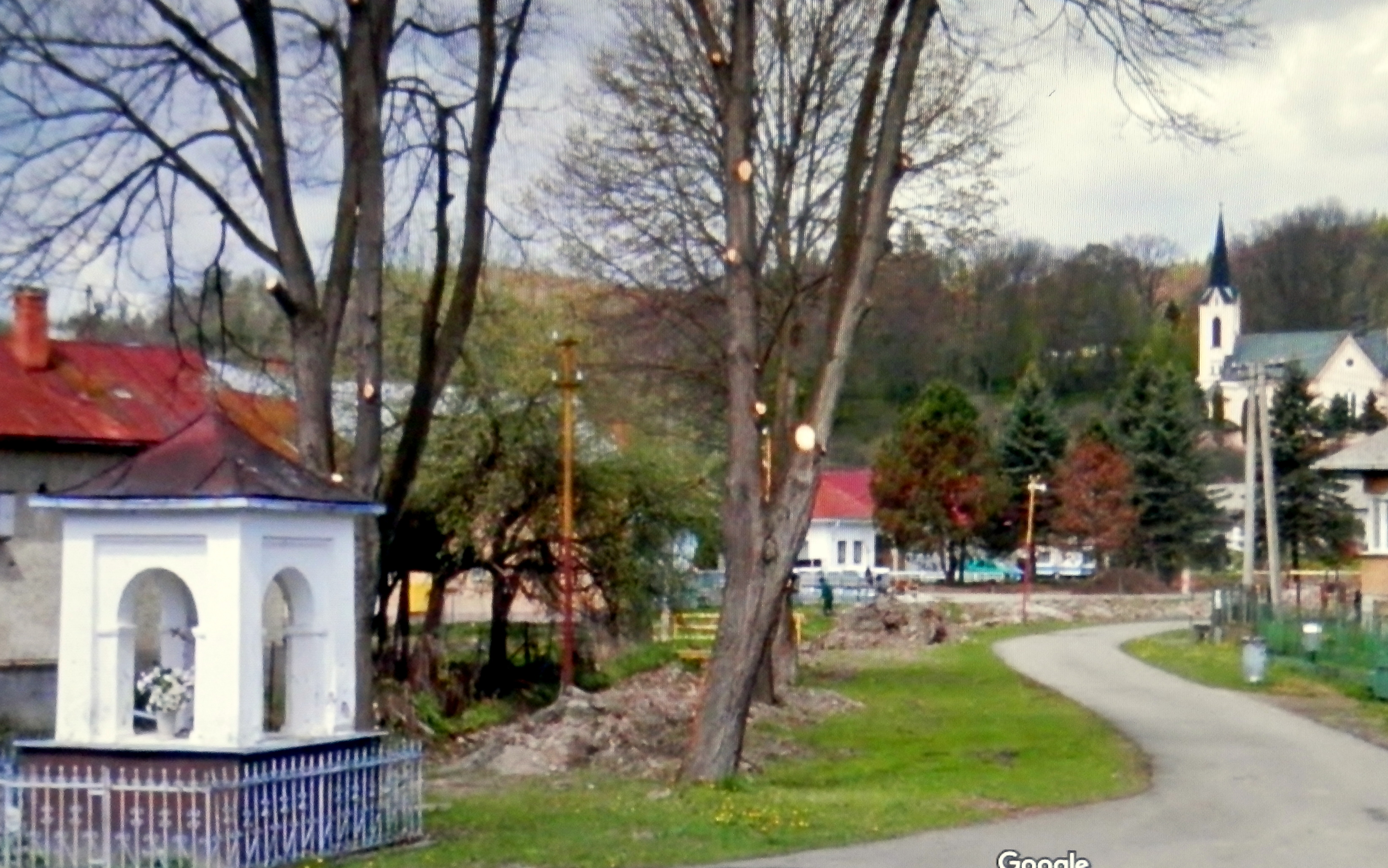

- Flag

- Location of Udavské in the Prešov Region Location of Udavské in Slovakia
- Coordinates: 48.98°N 21.97°E
- Country: Slovakia
- Region: Prešov Region
- District: Humenné District
- First mentioned: 1451

Area
  - Total: 13.20 km^{2} (5.10 sq mi)
- Elevation: 165 m (541 ft)

Population (2025)
  - Total: 1,219
- Time zone: UTC+1 (CET)
  - Summer (DST): UTC+2 (CEST)
- Postal code: 673 1
- Area code: +421 57
- Vehicle registration plate (until 2022): HE
- Website: www.udavske.sk

Udavské is a village and municipality in Humenné District in the Prešov Region of north-east Slovakia.

== History ==
In historical records the village was first mentioned in 1451.

== Geography ==
The municipality lies at an altitude of 165 metres (541 ft) and covers an area of 13.20 km^{2} (5.10 sq mi) (2025).

== Population ==
Population statistic (10 years)
Year	1995	2005	2015	2025
Count	1229	1268	1216	1219
Difference		+3.17%	−4.10%	+0.24%

Population statistic
Year	2024	2025
Count	1232	1219
Difference		−1.05%

It has a population of 1219 people (31 December 2025).

=== Ethnicity ===
Census 2021 (1+ %)
Ethnicity	Number	Fraction
Slovak	1177	95.61%
Rusyn	60	4.87%
Not found out	35	2.84%
Total	1231	

In year 2021 was 1231 people by ethnicity 1177 as Slovak, 60 as Rusyn, 35 as Not found out, 4 as Czech, 2 as Ukrainian, 2 as Romani, 1 as Polish and 1 as Other.

Note on population: The difference values of population numbers in the table "Population statistic" and in the sections "Ethnicity" & "Religion" is caused by the use of various statistical methods.

=== Religion ===
Census 2021 (1+ %)
Religion	Number	Fraction
Roman Catholic Church	947	76.93%
Greek Catholic Church	136	11.05%
None	70	5.69%
Not found out	41	3.33%
Eastern Orthodox Church	24	1.95%
Total	1231	

In year 2021 was 1231 people by religion 947 from Roman Catholic Church, 136 from Greek Catholic Church, 70 from None, 41 from Not found out, 24 from Eastern Orthodox Church, 4 from Evangelical Church, 2 from Other and not ascertained christian church, 2 from Other, 2 from Ad hoc movements, 1 from Calvinist Church, 1 from Islam and 1 from Buddhism.
