= European University of Rome =

- Università Europea di Roma
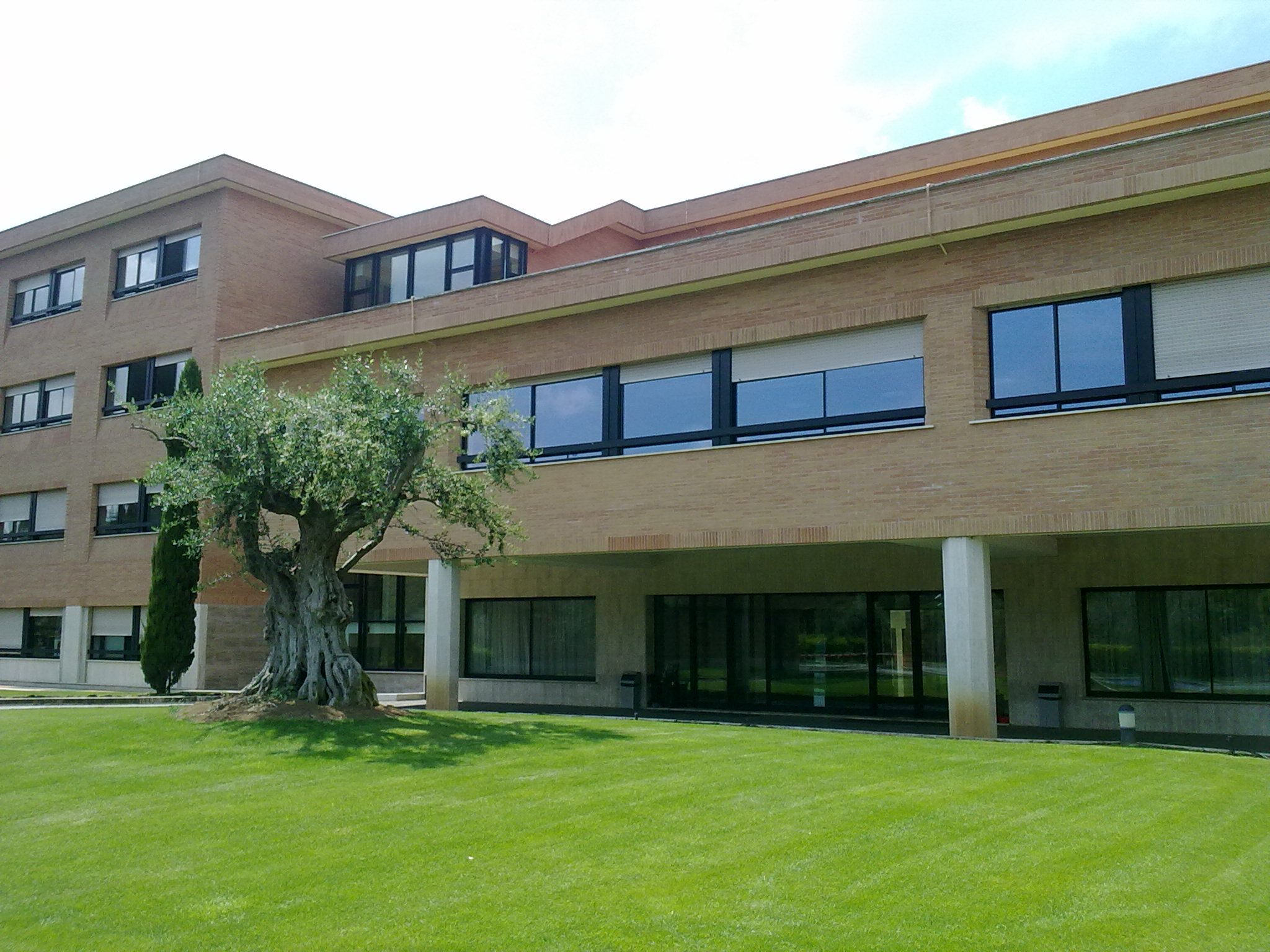
- Motto: Formiamo persone, prepariamo professionisti
- Type: Private
- Established: 2005
- Rector: Pedro Barrajón
- Location: 41°52′39″N 12°23′44″E
- Website: Official website

The European University of Rome (UER) is a university in Rome, Italy, located at Via degli Aldobrandeschi 190. It began its activities in 2005. It is oriented towards teaching the humanities, in particular: psychology, medicine, economics, management, law, education and tourism.

== History ==
The European University of Rome was founded by the religious congregation of the Legionaries of Christ. It is part of an international network of universities with locations in Italy, Chile, Mexico, and Spain.

== Structure ==
The university is organized as a single humanities department.

=== School of Higher Education ===
UER academy was established in 2019 as a school dedicated to professional and continuing education activities for skills development.

=== Library ===
The university's library, dedicated to Pius XII, holds documents, publications, databases and electronic resources pertaining to the disciplines taught at the European University of Rome and the Pontifical Athenaeum Regina Apostolorum and houses collections, including the library holdings of the Alcide De Gasperi Foundation.

=== University Residence ===
On October 17, 2019, the UER university residence hall was inaugurated.

== Research centers ==
There are several research centers in the university:

- Geographic Research and Application Laboratory (GREAL)
- Center for Research Excellence in Copyright (CREDA)
- Cognitive and Clinical Psychology Laboratory (CCPL)
- Center for Research on Ethical Taxation, Taxation and Economic Crimes (CRF)
- Center for the Study of Insurance Law (CESDA)
- Business@Health
- International Business and Tax Centre (IBTC)
- Innovation, Regulation and Competition Policy Centre (ICPC)
- Center for the Study of Heritage and Territory (CeSHeT)

== Sports ==
Since 2019, the university has its own sports group called Panthers. The activities in which it participates are: 8-a-side soccer, futsal, basketball, volleyball, rugby, padel, tennis, track and field, and chess. In the academic year 2022–2023, the 8-a-side soccer team is the first university team to participate in the Rome City 8-a-side Football League. The other disciplines, however, participate in the Rome University Championships.

== Rectors ==
- Paolo Scarafoni (2005–2013)
- Luca Gallizia (2013–2016)
- Pedro Amador Barrajón Muñoz (from 2016)
