= Office for the Liturgical Celebrations of the Supreme Pontiff =

Office in the Roman Curia

The Office for the Liturgical Celebrations of the Supreme Pontiff (Latin: Officium de Liturgicis Celebrationibus Summi Pontificis, Italian: Ufficio delle Celebrazioni Liturgiche del Sommo Pontefice) is the section of the Roman Curia responsible for preparing whatever is needed for the liturgical and other sacred celebrations in the Vatican at which the Pope, or – in his name and by his mandate – a Cardinal or a Prelate presides, participates or assists, and for supervising them according to the current prescriptions of liturgical law. It also arranges everything necessary or useful for their dignified celebration and for the active participation of the faithful. The Office is also responsible for the preparation and execution of all papal liturgical celebrations that take place during the pastoral visits of the Roman Pontiff and his Apostolic Journeys, bearing in mind the distinctive characteristics of papal celebrations.

Praedicate evangelium further explains the scope of their ministry which includes:

- Liturgical celebrations by the Pope in the Vatican, in his pastoral visits inside and outside Italy (Apostolic Journeys)
- Responsibility over the Papal Sacristy and Chapels of the Apostolic Palace
- Responsibility over the Sistine Chapel Choir
- Celebration of Papal consistories
- Liturgical celebrations of the College of Cardinals during the vacancy of the Apostolic See

The office and the consultants who advise it support the pope in expressing his interpretation of the liturgical modifications instituted following the Second Vatican Council. Popes have at times supported postconciliar reforms, restored earlier practices, and introduced further innovations. When Pope Francis named five new consultants in September 2013, he included none of those appointed by Pope Benedict XVI, who were known to promote a return to preconciliar liturgical practices. Benedict restored preconciliar elements to the rite for the canonization of saints and Francis removed them and further shortened the ceremony. Guido Marini, the Master when Francis instituted his changes, is known as a traditionalist, but performs to the pope's instructions. In the words of one journalist, his job is "to thread papal preferences into the pageantry". For example, he works to ensure that liturgical music is integrated into the liturgy as Francis prefers, so that participants are never forced to wait for music to conclude before proceeding. On 19 January 2019, Pope Francis transferred responsibility for the Sistine Chapel Choir from the papal household to this Office.

== List of the Masters of Pontifical Liturgical Celebrations ==
As Prefects of Pontifical Ceremonies:

- Francesco Riggi (1895–1918)
- Carlo Respighi (1918–1947)
- Enrico Dante (1947–1965)

Office of Prefect of Pontifical Ceremonies vacant during reform (1965–1970)

- Salvatore Capoferri [ad interim] (1965–1968)
- Annibale Bugnini [appointed delegate of the Consilium during reform of the Papal ceremonial] (1967–1970)
- Adone Terzariol [ad interim] (1968–1970)

Office re-established as Master of Pontifical Liturgical Celebrations in 1970

- Virgilio Noè (9 January 1970 – 30 January 1982)
- John Magee (6 March 1982 – 11 February 1987)
- Piero Marini (23 February 1987 – 1 October 2007)
- Guido Marini (1 October 2007 – 29 August 2021)
- Diego Ravelli (11 October 2021 – present)

== Officials under the Office of the Liturgical Celebrations of the Supreme Pontiff ==
In addition to assisting the pope at sacred functions, the Papal Master of Ceremonies assists cardinals on various occasions: during consistories, when a cardinal takes possession of his titular church, and during solemn celebrations of Mass or other important religious services. When a cardinal is created at a consistory, the Master of Papal Liturgical Celebrations assigns one of the Office's Masters of Ceremonies to him.

The Master is assisted by several Masters of Ceremonies. They at times hold other offices in the Roman Curia.

The official website of the Vatican lists six other Papal Masters of Ceremonies as of 2026, namely:

- Msgr. Massimiliano Matteo Boiardi, FSCB
- Msgr. Jan Dubina
- Msgr. Krzystof Marcjanowicz
- Msgr. Lubomir Welnitz
- Msgr. Didier Jean-Jacques Bouable
- Msgr. Marc Yala Banorani Djetaba

Other officials include clergy, consecrated, and laypersons, including three Augustinian priests responsible for the Papal Sacristy, and lay persons in-charge as keepers of the Sistine Chapel.

== See also ==
- Papal Mass

== Bibliography ==
- Günther Wassilowsky, Hubert Wolf: Päpstliches Zeremoniell in der Frühen Neuzeit – Das Diarium des Zeremonienmeisters Paolo Alaleone de Branca während des Pontifikats Gregors XV. (1621–1623). Rhema-Verlag, Münster 2007, ISBN 978-3-930454-80-8 (with the complete original Latin text of the diarium)
