= Guido Marini =

Italian Catholic prelate (born 1965)

The Most Reverend Guido Marini
- Bishop of Tortona
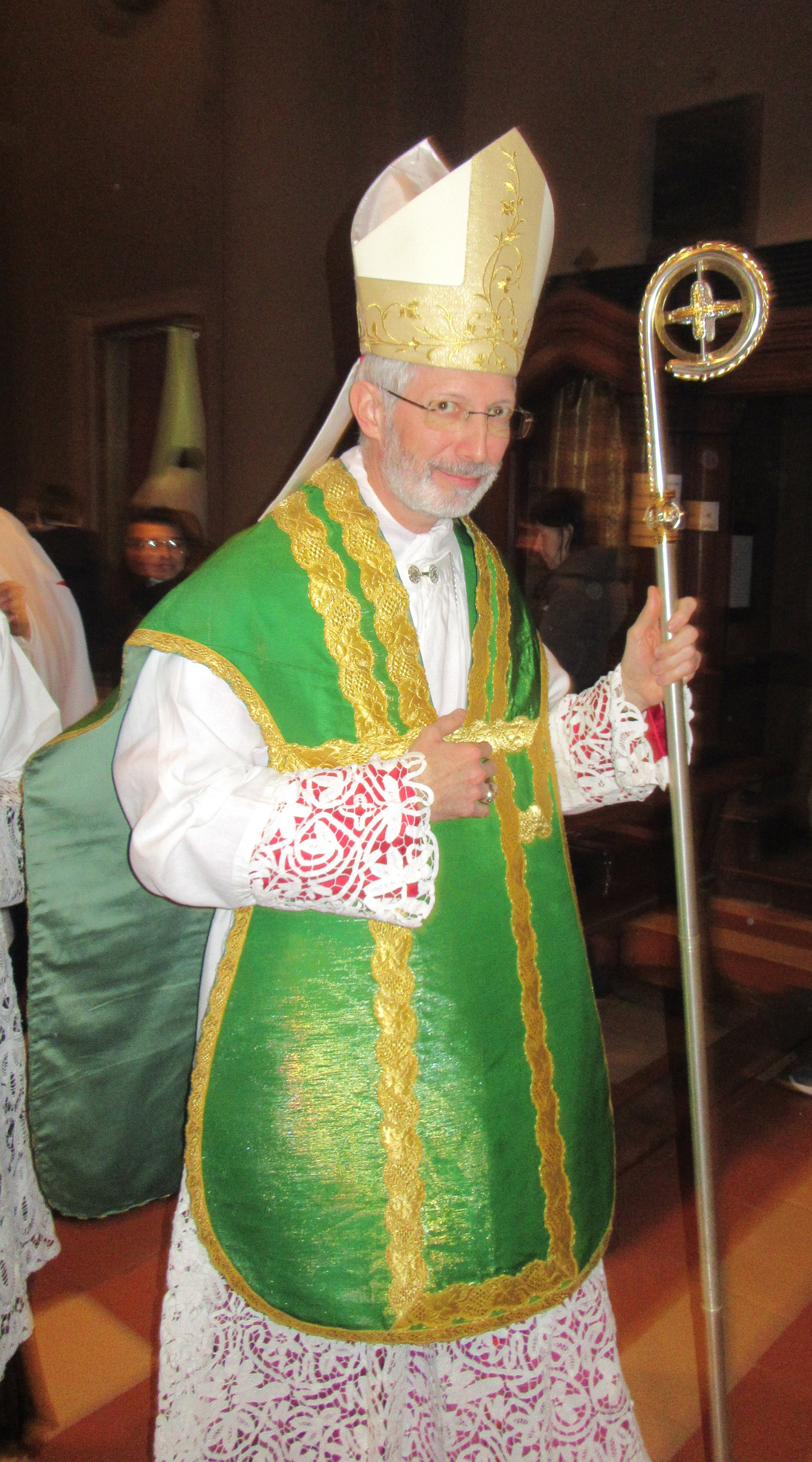
- Marini in 2024
- Church: Latin Church
- Province: Genoa
- Diocese: Tortona
- See: Tortona
- Appointed: 29 August 2021
- Installed: 7 November 2021
- Predecessor: Vittorio Francesco Viola
- Previous post: Master of Pontifical Liturgical Celebrations (2007–21)

Orders
- Ordination: 4 February 1989 by Giovanni Canestri
- Consecration: 17 October 2021 by Pope Francis, Marco Tasca, and Vittorio Francesco Viola

Personal details
- Born: 31 January 1965 (age 61) Genoa, Italy
- Education: Pontifical Lateran University; Pontifical Salesian University
- Motto: Emitte Spiritum Tuum (Latin for 'Send out Your Spirit')
- Signature: Guido Marini's signature
- Styles
- Reference style: The Most Reverend
- Spoken style: Your Excellency
- Religious style: Bishop

Guido Marini (born 31 January 1965) is an Italian prelate of the Latin Church serving as the Bishop of Tortona in northern Italy since 2021. A priest since 1989, from 2007 to 2021, he was Master of Pontifical Liturgical Ceremonies, serving under Pope Benedict XVI and Pope Francis. Before joining the papal household, Marini worked in the Archdiocese of Genoa, where he was the personal secretary to three archbishops from 1988 to 2003, chief liturgist from 2004 to 2007, and chancellor from 2005 to 2007.

== Early years ==
Marini was born in Genoa on 31 January 1965 and studied at the Liceo Colombo. He earned his B.A. in theology at the seminary in Genoa and was ordained a priest on 4 February 1989 by Cardinal Giovanni Canestri. He then earned a degree in both canon and civil law (JUD) from the Pontifical Lateran University with a dissertation on problems of church-state relations in the early 20th century.

He held the following positions in Genoa: secretary to the archbishop of Genoa from 1988 to 2003; (Note: They were Giovanni Canestri (1988–1995), Dionigi Tettamanzi (1995–2002) and Tarcisio Bertone (2002–2003).) master of liturgical celebrations from 2003 to 2007; member of the archdiocesan Council of Priests from 1996 to 2001; spiritual director of the seminary in Genoa from 2004 to 2007; and Chancellor of the Archdiocese from 2005 to 2007.

He earned a degree in the psychology of communication in 2007 from the Salesian Pontifical University.

== Master of Pontifical Liturgical Celebrations ==
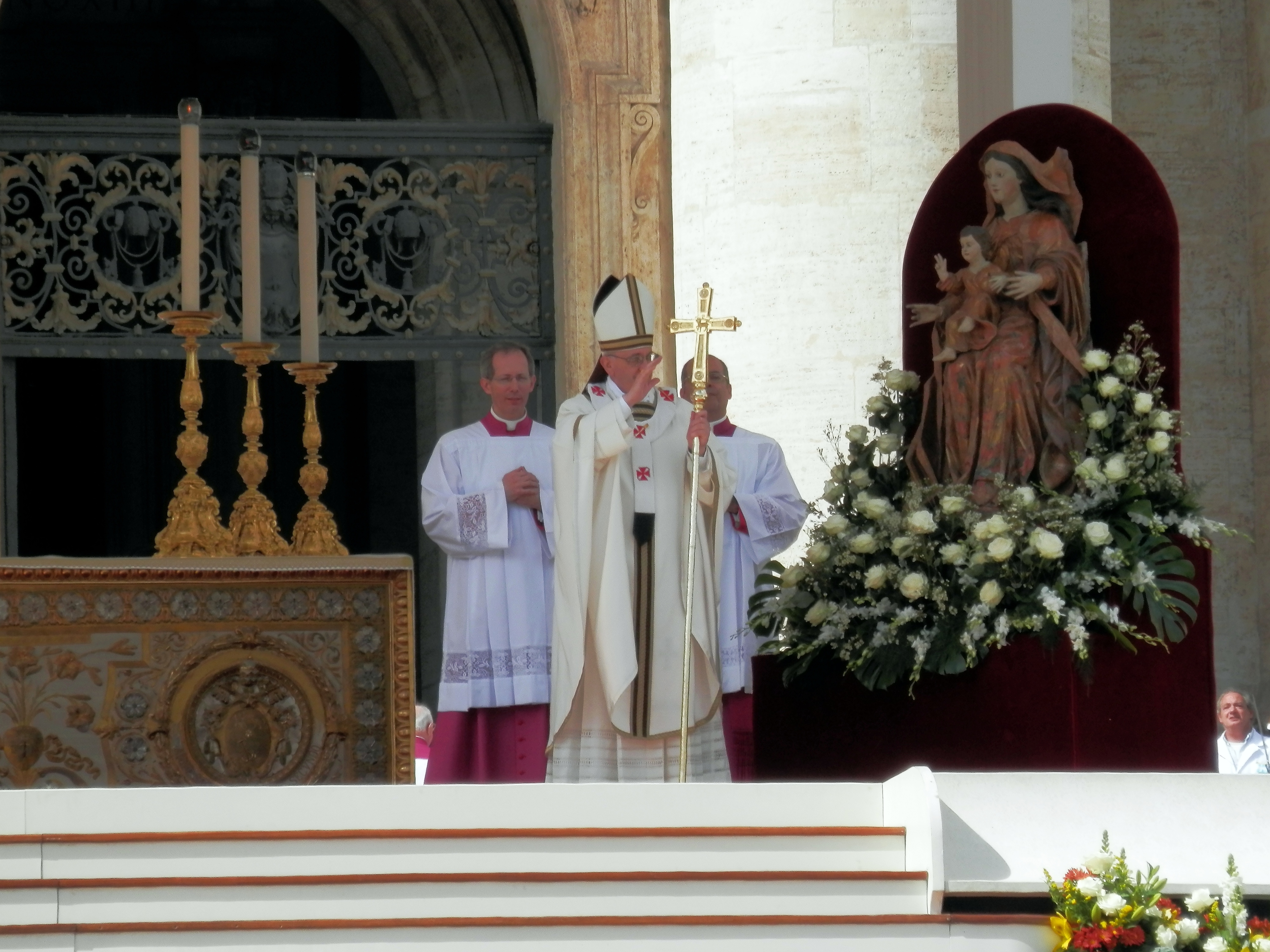
Marini in 2013 at the Inauguration of Pope Francis.

Marini was named Master of Pontifical Liturgical Ceremonies on 1 October 2007, appointed to another five-year term by Benedict XVI, confirmed in that office by Pope Francis in April 2014, and appointed to another five-year term in 2017. Francis also named him a member of the Congregation for the Oriental Churches on 19 February 2014.

Following his appointment as Master of Pontifical Liturgical Celebrations, the Papal Altar was rearranged with the seven candles and crucifix placed in a line across the altar rather than clustered on the sides. Discussing the changes he was implementing he said that compared to the liturgies celebrated under his predecessor, "now there is a different style, one that is more sober and more attentive to the essential things".

In a January 2010 speech, Marini supported calls in the Church for a "reform of the reform" of the liturgy. He said: "For some years now, several voices have been heard within Church circles talking about the necessity of a new liturgical renewal," adding that a new renewal movement would be "capable of operating a reform of the reform, or rather, move one more step ahead in understanding the authentic spirit of the liturgy and its celebration."

In 2015, Pope Francis made changes to the public ceremony of investiture of the pallium on metropolitan archbishops emphasizing that the investiture is an ecclesial event of the whole diocese, and not merely a juridical or ceremonial event. Marini said that from now on – starting from 29 June 2015 – the ceremony of investiture of the pallium will take place in each metropolitan archbishop's home diocese and not in the Vatican. (This has since, under Pope Leo in 2025, reverted to the earlier practice.)

Marini also made decisions about the use of vestments at Mass and other pontifical celebrations, dressing cardinal deacons in dalmatics when serving at pontifical celebrations.

In 2019, Pope Francis made Marini's office responsible for the Sistine Chapel Choir, which until then operated independently within the papal household.

From the time of his priestly ordination, first in Genoa and then in Rome, he preached and provided spiritual direction, at times working with youth groups and communities of religious.

=== Papal conclave 2013 ===
Marini was Master of Ceremonies in the 2013 conclave that elected Pope Francis. On 11 March 2013, the day before the conclave, at a ceremony presided over by the Camerlengo Tarcisio Bertone, Marini led the non-cardinal officials, support staff and other non-elector personnel with duties in the conclave in taking an oath of secrecy pertaining to the conclave. The next day, after the cardinal-electors had taken their oath in the Sistine Chapel, Marini called out the command "Extra omnes" (Everyone out) and closed the chapel doors once all outsiders had left the chapel.

== Bishop ==
On 29 August 2021, Pope Francis appointed him bishop of Tortona. Pope Francis consecrated him as a bishop in St. Peter's Basilica on 17 October, with Marini's installation in Tortona following on 7 November.

== Works ==
- Liturgical Reflections of a Papal Master of Ceremonies. Newman House. 2011. ISBN 978-0977884650.

== Notes ==
Catholic Church titles
Preceded by Piero Marini	Master of Pontifical Liturgical Celebrations; 1 October 2007 – 29 August 2021	Succeeded by Diego Giovanni Ravelli
Preceded by Vittorio Francesco Viola, OFM	Bishop of Tortona; 29 August 2021 – present	Incumbent
