= Antony John Baptist =

Indian Catholic priest and theologian

The Reverend Dr Antony John Baptist
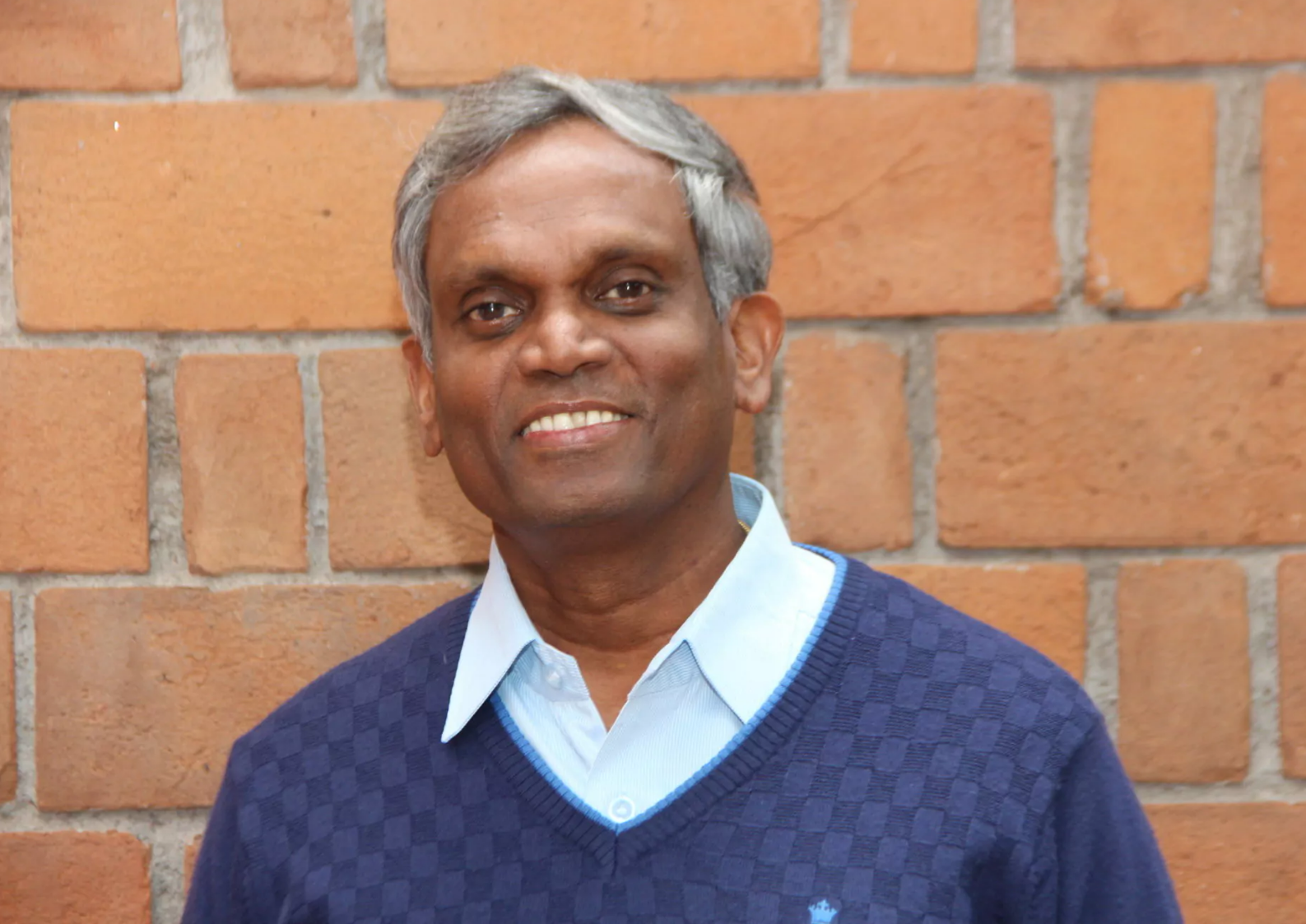
- Antony John Baptist
- Church: Catholic Church
- Diocese: Vellore
- Other posts: Director, National Biblical, Catechetical and Liturgical Centre

Personal details
- Born: 15 April 1965 (age 61) Tiruvannamalai, Tamil Nadu
- Occupation: Priest, biblical scholar, theologian, church historian

Academic background
- Education: University of Madras, Chennai (BA, PhD & DLitt); Pontifical Biblical Institute, Rome (Licentiate (SSL)); Annamalai University (MA, History)
- Alma mater: University of Madras
- Theses: Character of Hagar in Genesis 16:1–16: A Narrative Study from the Perspective of Dalit Women (PhD) (2009); Biblical Interpretation from the Perspective of Dalit Women (DLitt) (2024)
- Doctoral advisor: Felix Wilfred

Academic work
- Era: 21st Century
- Discipline: Old Testament
- Sub-discipline: Pentateuch, Biblical Narratives, Dalit Feminist Reading
- School or tradition: Catholic
- Institutions: University of Madras, National Biblical, Catechetical and Liturgical Centre, DVK Pontifical Athenaeum, St. Peter's Pontifical Institute

Antony John Baptist (born April 15, 1965) is an Indian Catholic priest from Tamil Nadu, biblical scholar, theologian and pastor. He serves as the director of the National Biblical, Catechetical and Liturgical Centre (NBCLC) in Bangalore. His academic and pastoral work is focused on contextual theology and the interpretation of biblical narratives, particularly from the perspective of marginalised communities such as Dalit women.

== Education ==
Antony John Baptist holds a Doctor of Philosophy (PhD) and a Doctor Litterarum (DLitt) from the University of Madras, where he studied in the Department of Christian Studies. He also earned a Licentiate in Sacred Scripture (LSS) from the Pontifical Biblical Institute in Rome. Apart from his theological studies, he has earned a BA in History from University of Madras and an MA in History from Annamalai University.

== Career ==
Baptist served the Diocese of Vellore as a member of the College of Consultors, a member of the Priests’ Senate, Secretary to the Diocesan Bible Commission, and Secretary to the Diocesan Vocation Commission. He held academic and formation roles as Vice-Rector of Sacred Heart College, Poonamallee, and later as Rector of St Francis Xavier Inter-diocesan Seminary, Veppoor.

Baptist also served as Secretary to the Commission for the Bible of the Tamil Nadu Bishops’ Council. Since May 2017, he has been the Executive Secretary of the Conference of Catholic Bishops of India (CCBI), Bible Commission. In January 2021, Baptist was appointed as the Director of the National Biblical Catechetical and Liturgical Centre (NBCLC) in Bangalore, under the Catholic Bishops' Conference of India (CBCI).

Baptist is a member of the Editorial Board of Concilium journal. He also serves on the Translations Committee of the Bible Society of India, and as the Coordinator for the South Asian Sub-region of the Catholic Biblical Federation.

In addition to his leadership roles, Baptist teaches as adjunct faculty at Vidya Deep College, DVK Pontifical Athenaeum, St. Peter's Pontifical Seminary and also at the Department of Christian Studies at the University of Madras, where he has served as a visiting professor.

== Selected Publications ==
=== Books ===
- Thus Spoke the Bible: Basics of Biblical Narratives (2nd ed., revised and enlarged ed.). Bengaluru: Theological Publications in India. 2024. ISBN 978-93-95623-94-0.
- Planted by the Stream: Biblical Themes for Today. Bengaluru: ATC. 2019. ISBN 978-93-86516-77-0.
- Thus Spoke the Bible: Basics of Biblical Narratives. New Delhi: ISPCK. 2024. ISBN 978-81-8465-565-0.
- Unsung Melodies from Margins. New Delhi: ISPCK. 2014. ISBN 978-81-8465-378-6.
- Together as Sisters: Hagar and Dalit Women. New Delhi: ISPCK. 2012. ISBN 978-81-8465-265-9.
- Baptist, A. John; Majumdar Kar, Suparna; Newman, Paul; Mathew, John V.; Patrick, Gnana, eds. (2025). Religion and Society: Interdisciplinary Explorations. Bangalore: Omega Book World. ISBN 978-93-48534-89-7.

=== Book chapters ===
- Antony, John Baptist (2026). "Survival and Wellbeing as Salvation: A Study in the Hagar Narratives in Genesis from Dalit Feminine Perspective". In Gatti, Nicoletta; Gmainer-Pranzl, Franz; Kowalski, Beate (eds.). Salvation in a Crisis-Ridden World: An Intercultural Biblical Response. Brill. pp. 38–52. doi:10.30965/9783657705528-005. ISBN 9783657705528.
- Antony, John Baptist (2026). "Hagar in Triple Readings: Ancient Israelite, Early Christian, and Contemporary Indian". In Gatti, Nicoletta; Gmainer-Pranzl, Franz (eds.). Contextual Readings of the Bible — Volume 1: Culture, Bible, Identity: Christian Faith and Interculturality. Vatican City: Catholic Biblical Federation. pp. 94–112. ISBN 979-12-985473-6-0.
- Joy Philip Kakkanattu and Laurence Culas, ed. (2022). "Evolution and Sustaining of Covenant Community in Pentateuch and Historical Books". Being and Becoming Ecclesia: Biblical Perspectives. CBAI Seminar Papers 5. Bengaluru: Theological Publications in India. pp. 23–41. ISBN 978-81-9523-495-0.
- Assisi Saldanha, ed. (2020). "Missionary Ongoing Formation: Biblical, Catechetical, Spiritual, and Theological". Faith Working through Love: Evangelization and Its Horizons. Bangalore: Commission for Bible. pp. 179–190. ISBN 978-93-8896-850-8.
- Prema Vakayil and Laurence Culas, ed. (2017). "Movements from a Triumphantalistic Perspective to a Kenotic Perspective in Deuteronomistic History". Call to Self-Emptying: Biblical Perspectives. Bengaluru: Theological Publications in India. pp. 27–38. ISBN 978-93-83163-77-9.
- Savarimuthu, Stanislas; Titus, P. Joseph; Kumar, M. David Stanly; Joseph, A. Alfred, eds. (2017). "New Avenues of Biblical Apostolate in India Today". Like a Watered Garden. Vol. 2. Bengaluru: Theological Publications in India. pp. 421–441.
- Marie-Theres Wacker (2016). "Subalterns Speak Up: Dalit Women". Baruch Letter of Jeremiah, Wisdom Commentary. Vol. 31. Collegeville: Liturgical Press. pp. 98–99, 104–105, 110–111, 116, 120. ISBN 978-0814681558.
- Rayanna Govindu, ed. (2016). "Family as Domestic Church in the Sacred Scripture". Word of God, Source of Life in the Family: Proceedings of the Catholic Biblical Federation, South Asia Sub-Region Convocation. Bengaluru: CBF South Asia. pp. 47–59.
- Titus, P. Joseph; S., Stanislas; Kumar, M. David Stanly; Joseph, A. Alfred, eds. (2015). "The Belief of Early Church on the Resurrection of Jesus in the Light of 1 Cor 15". Riches of His Grace: Studies on Johannine and Pauline Literature: A Festschrift for Professor Dr. Aloysius Xavier. Bengaluru: Theological Publications in India. pp. 341–357. ISBN 978-93-83163-37-3.
- P. Joseph Titus and Dexter S. Maben, ed. (2015). "Encountering the Divine: A Study of Hagar's Encounter with God in Gen 16". Bible and Mission: Biblical Perspectives for Doing Mission in Contemporary India. Bangalore: SBSI. pp. 21–35.
- T. K. John and James Massey, ed. (2013). "Testimonies as Representation of Dalit Women Reality and Their Use in Researches". Theology for a New Community. New Delhi: Centre for Dalit/Subaltern Studies. pp. 173–187. ISBN 978-93-81907-04-7.
- Textbook for M.A. Christian Studies (ed.). "Justice in the Bible". Christian Ethics. Chennai: University of Madras. pp. 135–157.

Apart from these, Baptist has also published numerous academic papers.
