= Interdicasterial Commission for Consecrated Religious =

Part of the Roman Curia

The Permanent Interdicasterial Commission for Consecrated Religious is part of the Roman Curia. It was established in 1989 to better handle religious in missionary lands, mostly in Africa and Asia. It became necessary when Pastor Bonus gave jurisdiction over internal community life of missionary religious from the Congregation for the Evangelization of Peoples to the Congregation for Institutes of Consecrated Life and for Societies of Apostolic Life which has greater knowledge of the religious communities. The work of missionary religious remains under Peoples.

The president of the Interdicasterial Commission is the prefect of the Congregation for the Evangelization of Peoples, currently Cardinal Luis Antonio Tagle. Other members include the prefect and secretary of the Congregation for Institutes of Consecrated Life and Societies of Apostolic Life and the secretary and under-secretary of the Congregation for the Evangelization of Peoples.

== Presidents of the Permanent Interdicasterial Commission for Consecrated Religious ==
- Cardinal Jozef Tomko (18 March 1989 – 9 April 2001)
- Cardinal Crescenzio Sepe (9 April 2001 – 20 May 2006)
- Cardinal Ivan Dias (20 May 2006 – 10 May 2011)
- Cardinal Fernando Filoni (10 May 2011 – 08 December 2019)
- Cardinal Luis Antonio Tagle (8 December 2019)
