= Luis Antonio Tagle =

Filipino Catholic cardinal (born 1957)

His Eminence Luis Antonio Tagle OESSH
- Dean of the College of Cardinals
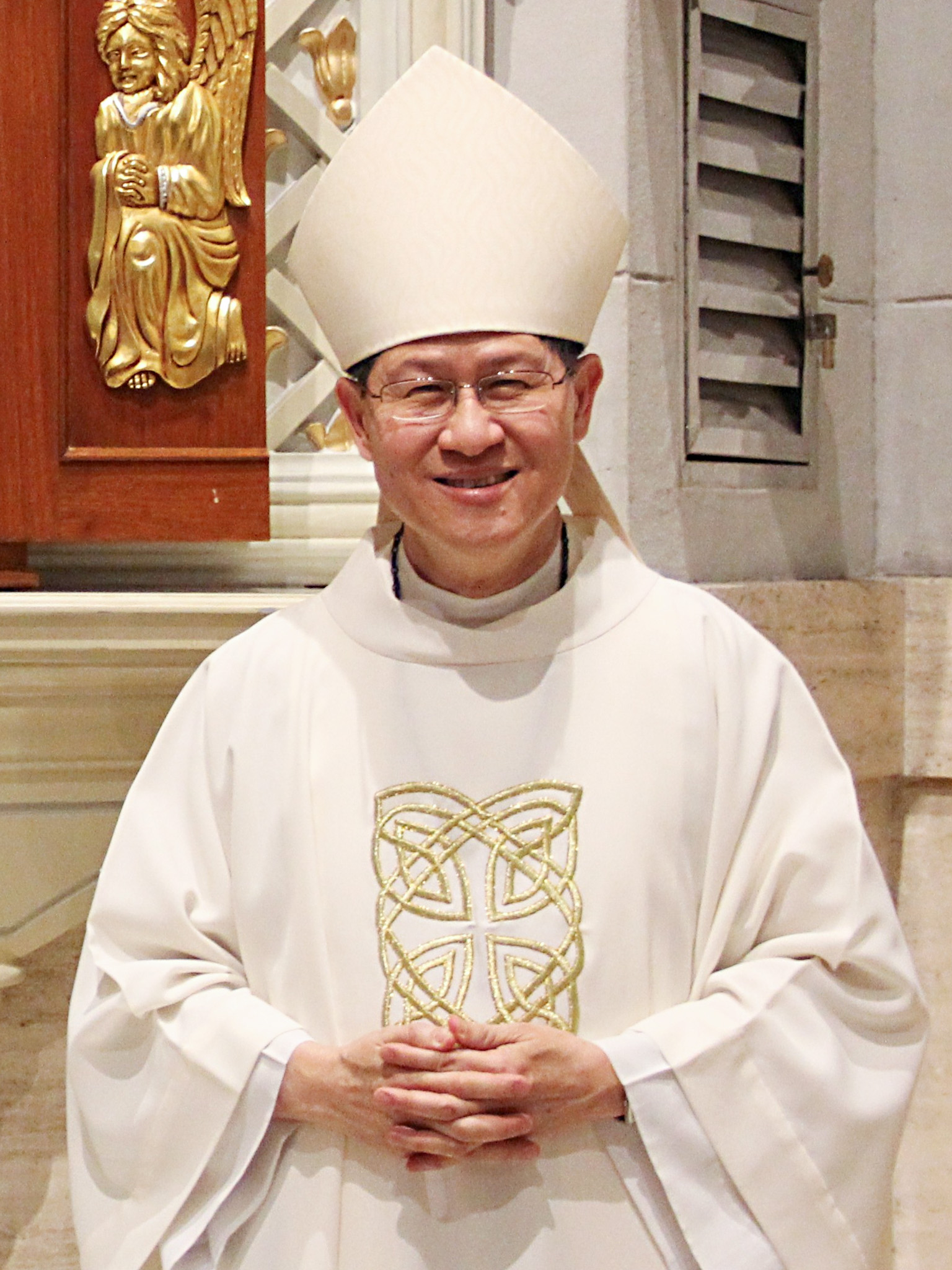
- Tagle in 2016
- Church: Latin Church
- Province: Rome
- See: Ostia and Albano
- Appointed: October 9, 2026
- Predecessor: Giovanni Battista Re
- Other posts: President of the Catholic Biblical Federation (2015–); Grand Chancellor of the Pontifical Urbaniana University (2019–); President of the Interdicasterial Commission for Consecrated Religious (2019–); Pro-Prefect for the Section for First Evangelization and New Particular Churches (2022–); Cardinal Bishop of Albano (2025–); Cardinal Bishop of Ostia (2026–)
- Previous posts: Bishop of Imus (2001‍–‍2011); Archbishop of Manila (2011‍–‍2020); Cardinal Priest of San Felice da Cantalice a Centocelle (2012‍–‍2020); President of Caritas Internationalis (2015‍–‍2022); Prefect of the Congregation for the Evangelization of Peoples (2019‍–‍2022); Cardinal Bishop of San Felice da Cantalice a Centocelle (2020‍–‍2025)

Orders
- Ordination: February 27, 1982 by Félix Paz Pérez
- Consecration: December 12, 2001 by Jaime Sin
- Created cardinal: November 24, 2012 by Pope Benedict XVI
- Rank: Cardinal priest (2012‍–‍2020); Cardinal bishop (since 2020)

Personal details
- Born: Luis Antonio Gokim Tagle; June 21, 1957 (age 69) Manila, Philippines
- Residence: Pontificio Collegio Filippino
- Education: Ateneo de Manila University (BA, MA); Catholic University of America (STD)
- Motto: Dominus est (Latin for 'It is the Lord') (Note: John 21:7)
- Signature: Luis Antonio Tagle's signature

- Coat of arms: Luis Antonio Tagle's coat of arms

Ordination history
History
Priestly ordination
- Ordained by: Felix Paz Perez
Episcopal consecration
- Principal consecrator: Jaime Sin
- Co-consecrators: Manuel Sobreviñas; Pedro Dulay Arigo
Cardinalate
- Elevated by: Pope Benedict XVI
Episcopal succession
Bishops consecrated by Luis Antonio Tagle as principal consecrator
- Victor Ocampo: August 29, 2015
- Alberto Uy: January 5, 2017
- Rex Ramirez: January 9, 2018
- Bartolome Santos: April 30, 2018
- Raul Dael: June 7, 2018
- Roberto Gaa: August 22, 2019
- Jose Alan Dialogo: December 12, 2019
- Giorgio Marengo: August 8, 2020
- Arnaldo Catalan: February 11, 2022
- Emilio Nappa: January 28, 2023
- Pablito Tagura: February 17, 2023
- Osório Citora Afonso: January 28, 2024
- Samuele Sangalli: March 19, 2025
- Diego Sarrió Cucarella: March 19, 2025
- Samuel Naceno Agcaracar: January 17, 2026

Luis Antonio Gokim Tagle (/ˈtɑːɡlɛ/ TAH-gleh, Tagalog: [lʊˈwis ɐnˈtonɪo ˈtaɡlɛ]; born June 21, 1957), also nicknamed Chito, is a Filipino prelate of the Latin Church who serves in the Roman Curia. He has been Dean of the College of Cardinals since 2026 and has been one of two pro-prefects of the Dicastery for Evangelization since 2022. As a member of the order of cardinal bishops, he holds the suburbicarian sees of Ostia and Albano.

Tagle is also president of the Catholic Biblical Federation and of the Interdicasterial Commission for Consecrated Religious, and grand chancellor of the Pontifical Urbaniana University. Dubbed the "Asian Francis", Tagle is often seen as a representative of the Catholic Church's progressive wing. He was called a papabile in the 2013 and 2025 conclaves.

Before his assignments in Rome, Tagle served as Bishop of Imus from 2001 to 2011 and as Archbishop of Manila from 2011 to 2020.

== Early life and education ==
Tagle was born in Manila on June 21, 1957. He is the eldest child of Manuel Tagle Sr. and Milagros Gokim, who is Chinese Filipino and previously worked for Equitable Bank. Tagle's paternal grandfather, Florencio, came from Imus, Cavite. The Tagle family was from the lowland Christian aristocracy of the Spanish colonial period, known as the principalía, who were the elite prior to the 1896 Philippine Revolution. Florencio was injured in a bomb explosion during the Second World War. Tagle's grandmother made a living by running a local diner. The Tagle surname is originally Spanish, from the northern region of Cantabria, and some of its bearers migrated to the Philippines via Mexico.

After completing elementary and high school at St. Andrew's School in Parañaque in 1973, Tagle was influenced by priest friends to enter the Jesuit San José Seminary, which sent him to the Ateneo de Manila University, where he earned a bachelor of arts degree in pre-divinity in 1977 and a master of arts in theology.

Tagle earned his doctorate in sacred theology at the Catholic University of America, where he studied from 1987 to 1991. He wrote his dissertation, titled "Episcopal Collegiality in the Teaching and Practice of Paul VI", under the direction of Joseph Komonchak. Tagle also attended doctrinal courses at the Institute of Pope Paul VI University. Komonchak called Tagle one of his "best students" and remarked that he "could have become the best theologian in the Philippines, or even in all of Asia" had he not been appointed bishop.

Tagle has received honorary degrees from Catholic Theological Union and La Salle University. A native Tagalog speaker, he is fluent in English and Italian. He is also proficient in reading Spanish, French, Korean, Chinese, and Latin.

== Priesthood ==
Tagle was ordained a priest for the Diocese of Imus on February 27, 1982. He held several positions, including associate pastor of San Agustín Parish in Mendez (1982–1984) and spiritual director (1982–1983) and later rector (1983–1985, 1993–2001) of the Tahanan ng Mabuting Pastol, the diocesan seminary of Imus. He also taught theology at San Carlos Seminary (1982–1985) and at Divine Word Seminary in Tagaytay. After studying in the United States from 1985 to 1992, he returned to Imus, where he served as episcopal vicar for religious (1993–1995) and as parish priest and rector (1998–2001) of the Imus Cathedral.

In 1997, Pope John Paul II appointed Tagle to the International Theological Commission, where he served until 2002 under its president, Cardinal Joseph Ratzinger (the future Pope Benedict XVI). From 1995 to 2001, he was also a member of the editorial board of the History of Vatican II project.

== Bishop of Imus (2001–2011) ==
Tagle's coat of arms as Bishop of Imus

On October 22, 2001, Pope John Paul II appointed Tagle as the bishop of Imus, where he had served as parish priest of its cathedral since 1998. He received his episcopal consecration on December 12. During his ten-year tenure, he lived simply, did not own a car, and invited impoverished residents to share meals with him.

At the general assembly of the first Synod of Bishops under Pope Benedict XVI in 2005, Tagle spoke about the inadequacy of the number of priests in the Philippines. He said:

To respond to the hunger for the Eucharist, priests say many Masses, accept multiple intentions and send lay ministers for the service of the Word with Communion.... The Faithful know the difference between a bible service and Eucharist, a priest and a lay minister. Many communities wait for the gift of the priesthood and the Eucharist with humility.

Regarding the concept that priestly vocation is a gift from God, Tagle countered that "we should also ask whether the Church is a good steward of the gift." He remarked in a news conference, "The first Sunday after my ordination as a priest, I said nine Masses, and that is regular in the Philippines." Discussing priestly celibacy, Cardinal Angelo Scola, the synod moderator, expressed reservations about modifications to the church's requirement of celibacy for the priesthood. In response, Tagle suggested that the church should consider such a change to combat the shortage of priests.

At the 2008 International Eucharistic Congress in Quebec, Canada, Tagle delivered a talk on the importance of the Eucharist that reportedly moved audience members to tears. In his speech, he contrasted Christian worship with contemporary social, economic, and political priorities:

It is sad that those who worship idols sacrifice other people while preserving themselves and their interests. How many factory workers are being denied the right wages for the god of profit? How many women are being sacrificed to the god of domination? How many children are being sacrificed to the god of lust? How many trees, rivers, hills are being sacrificed to the god of "progress"? How many poor people are being sacrificed to the god of greed? How many defenseless people are being sacrificed to the god of national security?

== Archbishop of Manila (2011–2020) ==
Tagle's coat of arms as Archbishop of Manila

Pope Benedict XVI appointed Tagle the 32nd archbishop of Manila on October 13, 2011, to succeed Cardinal Gaudencio Rosales. According to Catalino Arévalo, the first Asian member of the Vatican's International Theological Commission, Tagle's appointment was promoted by the papal nuncio to the Philippines, Edward Joseph Adams, and by Rosales, but some objections were submitted to the Congregation for Bishops, which caused some delay in processing his appointment. Prior to his installation, Tagle made a pilgrimage to the Holy Land in October 2011. Tagle was installed as archbishop on December 12, 2011, the feast day of Our Lady of Guadalupe and the tenth anniversary of his episcopal consecration. He received the pallium, the symbol of his authority as a metropolitan archbishop, from Benedict XVI on June 29, 2012, in Rome.

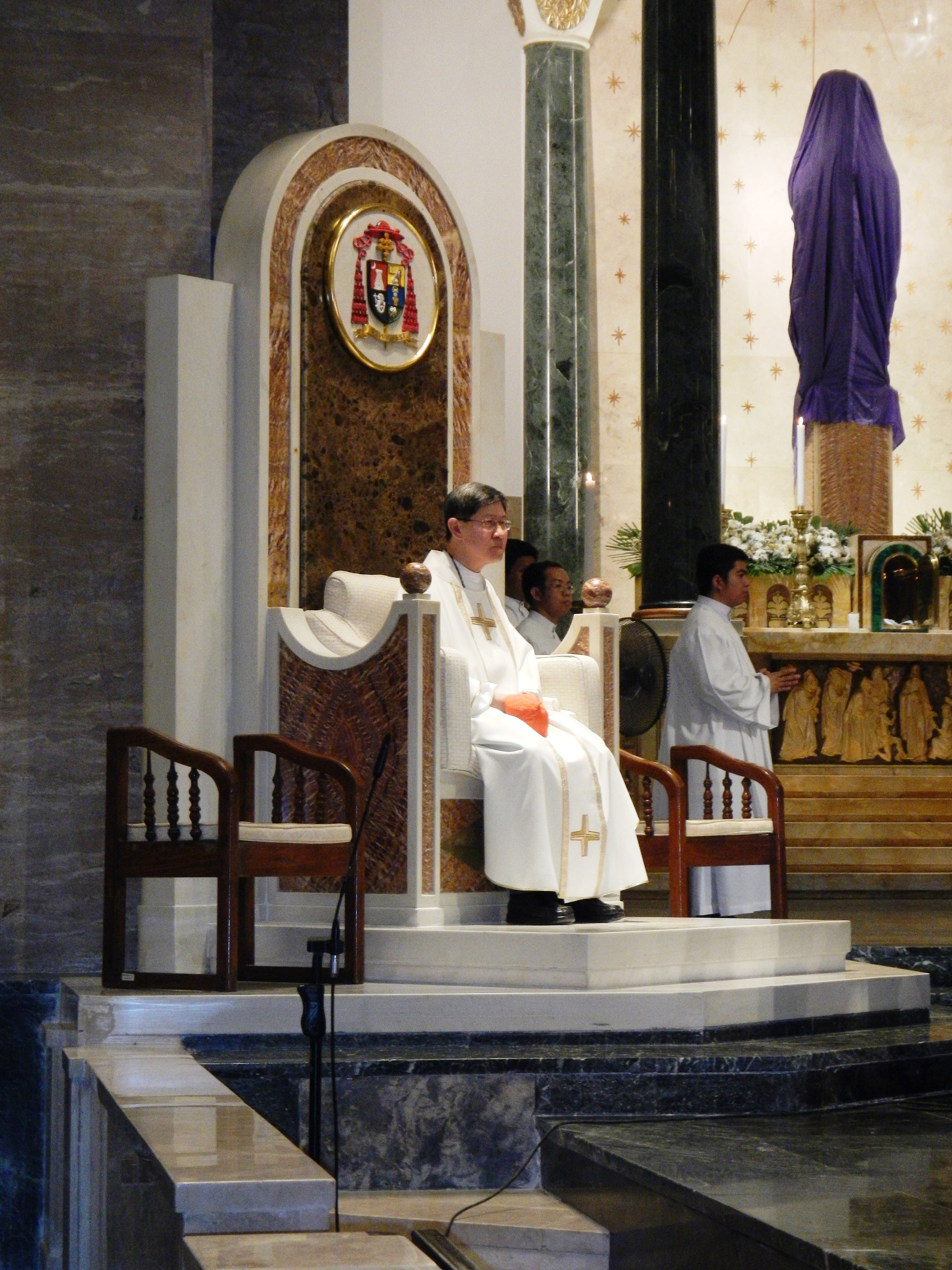
Tagle seated on the cathedra of the Manila Cathedral, April 2014

In February 2012, Tagle attended the Symposium for Healing and Renewal at the Pontifical Gregorian University in Rome. Tagle discussed the way the sex-abuse crisis manifests itself in Asia, where it is more common for priests to violate their vows of celibacy by taking mistresses than to engage in the sexual abuse of minors. Tagle maintained that the deference to authority typical of Asian culture combined with the dominance of the Catholic Church in a country like the Philippines produced a "culture of shame" that continued to inhibit the reporting of instances of abuse. He said that culture needed to change though he anticipated great difficulties:

The relative silence with which the victims and Asian Catholics face the scandal is partly due to the culture of "shame" that holds dearly one's humanity, honor, and dignity. For Asian cultures, a person's shame tarnishes one's family, clan, and community. Silence could be a way of preserving what is left of one's honor.

Tagle said the fact his country had a "touching culture" that created problems of interpretation and mandatory reporting laws would face cultural hurdles as well.

On June 12, 2012, Tagle was appointed a member of the Congregation for Catholic Education for a five-year renewable term. That same day, Tagle spoke at the 50th International Eucharistic Congress in Dublin, Ireland. He discussed how the sexual abuse crisis requires the Catholic Church to reevaluate its relationship with the media. He said: "As we challenge them to be fair and truthful in whatever they are reporting, the Church should also be prepared to be scrutinised by media, provided the norms of fairness and truthfulness are applied to all, especially the victims." He decried the tendency of church officials to resent negative media coverage even when accurate, while noting he had witnessed some media coverage in Asia that is tainted by "an anti-Christian sentiment." He also mentioned the various issues which distinguish the experience of the church in Ireland and similar cases in Asia.

On August 4, 2012, Tagle delivered a speech at a prayer rally against the Reproductive Health Bill, which included provisions for the funding and distribution of birth control information and devices; contraception is customarily considered abortion in the Philippines. He advocated for the recognition of women's rights by recognizing their valued role as mothers and wives, deserving of genuine love and respect as reflections of God and a gift to mankind. Tagle also denounced sexual prostitution as an affront to women's femininity. He took a more moderate stance on the legislation than other Philippine bishops, refusing to threaten politicians who supported the legislation with excommunication or to have posters criticizing its supporters as "Team Death" distributed in Manila's parishes.

Benedict XVI named Tagle as one of the synod fathers for the Synod of Bishops on the New Evangelisation on September 18, 2012. In his intervention at that synod, he outlined how he believed the church should approach the process of evangelization. He said:

The Church must discover the power of silence. Confronted with the sorrows, doubts, and uncertainties of people she cannot pretend to give easy solutions... The Church's humility, respectfulness, and silence might reveal more clearly the face of God in Jesus. The world takes delight in a simple witness to Jesus-meek and humble of heart.

In an interview with Vatican Radio, he explained how his view reflected the experience of Asian and Philippine culture:

The Church of Asia is often a minority Church, like John the Baptist crying in the wilderness ... even in the Philippines, though the Church is a majority. I realise that the sufferings of people and the difficult questions they ask are an invitation to be first in solidarity with them, not to pretend we have all the solutions. ... I believe the Church should contribute in the public square but we in Asia are very particular about the mode ... so you may be saying the right things but people will not listen if the manner by which you communicate reminds them of a triumphalist, know-it-all institution. ... I know that in some parts of Asia the relative silence, calmness of the Church is interpreted as timidity, but I say no – it makes the Church more credible.

=== Cardinal ===
Pope Benedict XVI announced he was elevating Archbishop Tagle to the College of Cardinals on October 24, 2012. (Note: The consistories at which Benedict XVI created cardinals in 2012 were unusual in that it was the first year since 1929 in which two consistories were held in the same calendar year. At the first in February all the new cardinals were European or members of the Roman Curia. Benedict explained on October 27: "I have wished, with this little consistory, to complete the consistory of February, precisely in the context of the new evangelization, with a gesture of the universality of the Church, showing that the Church is the Church of all peoples, speaks in all languages, is still the Church of Pentecost; not the Church of one continent, but the universal Church. Precisely this was my intention, to express this context, this universality of the Church." The November consistory was the first with no European created cardinal since 1924.) Tagle himself had been notified the night before. At that consistory, he was assigned the titular church of San Felice da Cantalice a Centocelle. Tagle was the seventh Filipino to be made a cardinal of the Catholic Church. When he became a cardinal he was the second youngest one. On December 1, 2012, upon his return to the Philippines, he presided at a thanksgiving Mass at the San Fernando de Dilao Church in Paco, Manila, which President Benigno Aquino III, Vice-president Jejomar Binay, and Mayor Alfredo Lim of Manila attended.

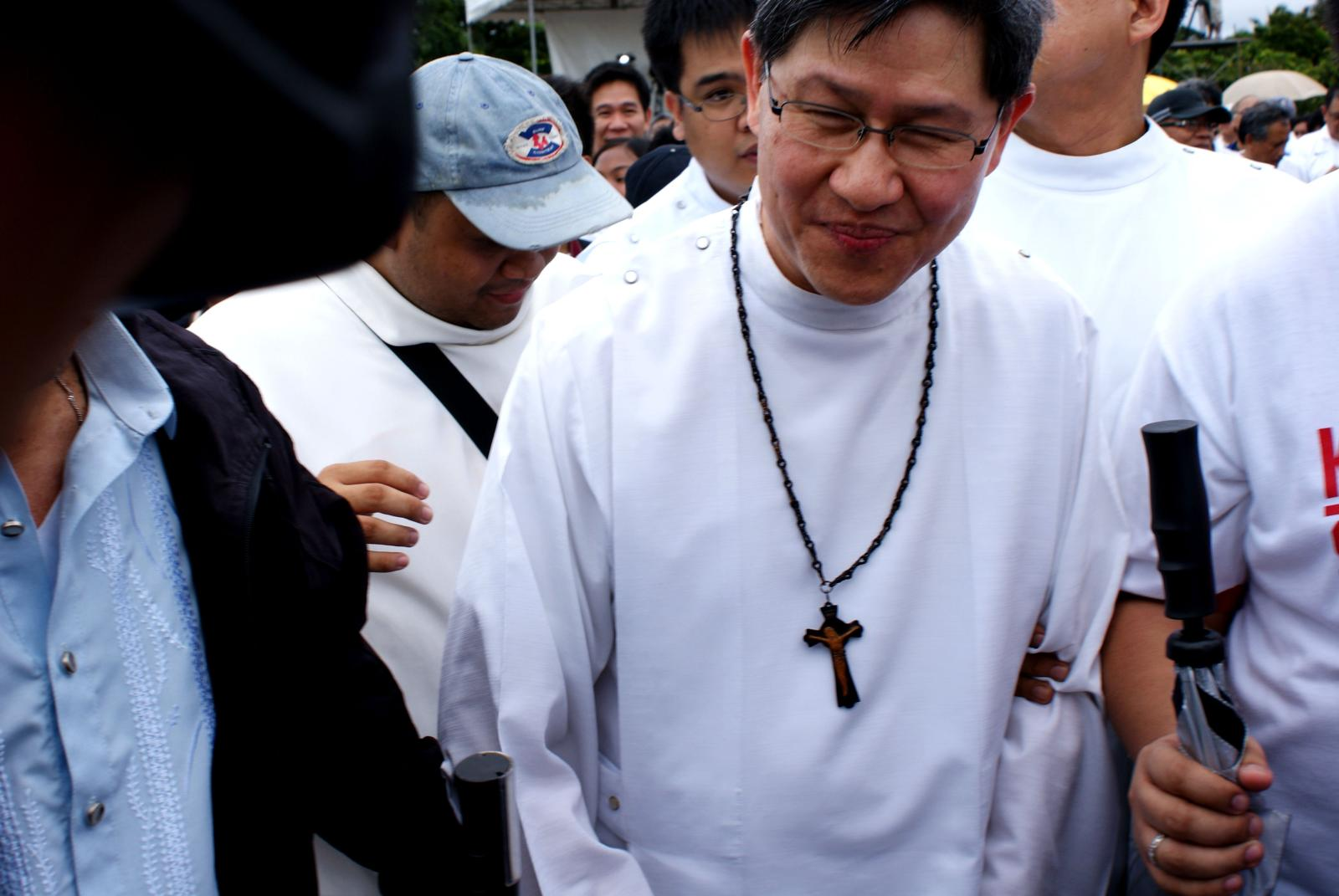
Cardinal Tagle at the Million People March in Rizal Park, 2013

On January 31, 2013, Pope Benedict XVI appointed Tagle to serve as a member of the Presidential Committee of the Pontifical Council for the Family and the Pontifical Council for the Pastoral Care of Migrants and Itinerants. Tagle was mentioned by some news organizations as a possible candidate for election as pope during the papal conclave that elected Pope Francis in 2013. Tagle led the National Consecration to the Immaculate Heart of Mary at the San Fernando de Dilao Church on June 8, 2013.

In response to the call of the Synod of New evangelization in 2012, Tagle founded the Philippine Conference on New Evangelization in 2013, and has been held annually ever since.

As the 2014 session of the synod approached, Tagle said he hoped that "the pastoral care of divorced and civilly remarried couples is debated openly and with good will," but emphasized other challenges drawn from his Philippine experience, especially the separation of married couples from one another and their children caused by poverty and migration. After the synod, he said:

I speak for my Philippines. In the preparation phase, I spoke quite a bit about poverty and the emigration phenomenon: two issues which are not exclusive to the family context affected the very core of family life. In our country there is no law on divorce. But people do divorce out of love. Fathers and mothers separate out of love for their children and one of them goes to the other side of the world to work. These separations are triggered by love. In the Philippines and countries affected by migration, we must, as a Church, accompany these people, help them to be faithful to their wives and husbands.

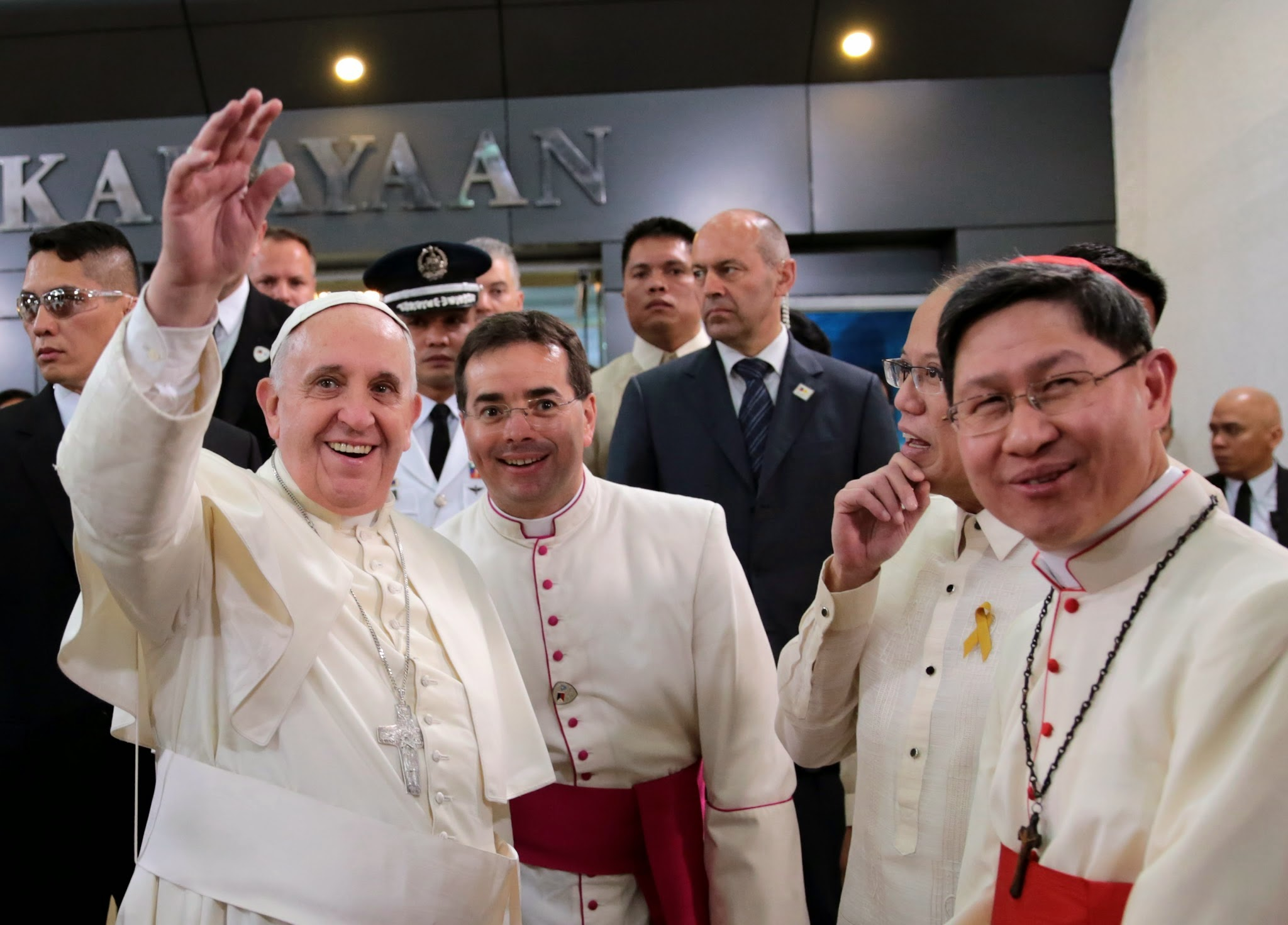
Tagle at Pope Francis' arrival in the Philippines with Philippine President Benigno Aquino III, January 2015

As cardinal and archbishop of Manila, Tagle served as committee chair during the Visit by Pope Francis to the Philippines in 2015. As such, he led the preparations for the pope's visit, and he was often seen alongside Pope Francis in almost every scheduled papal activity, especially those held in the Archdiocese of Manila. He would accompany Pope Francis at the popemobile (which Tagle blessed beforehand), and in occasions, serve as translator in some activities, such as the unscheduled visit to street children under the Tulay ng Kabataan Foundation, and the lunch with survivors of Super Typhoon Yolanda.

Following the publication of Pope Francis' encyclical Laudato si', Tagle launched a campaign in the Philippines to collect signatures for a petition against anthropogenic global warming caused by carbon dioxide emissions. As the Synod on the Family opened public discussion of allowing divorced and remarried Catholics to receive communion, Tagle said he was open to hearing arguments on the question. He said: "We have a principle we have to believe in. But the openness comes on pastoral judgments you have to make in concrete situations, because no two cases are alike."

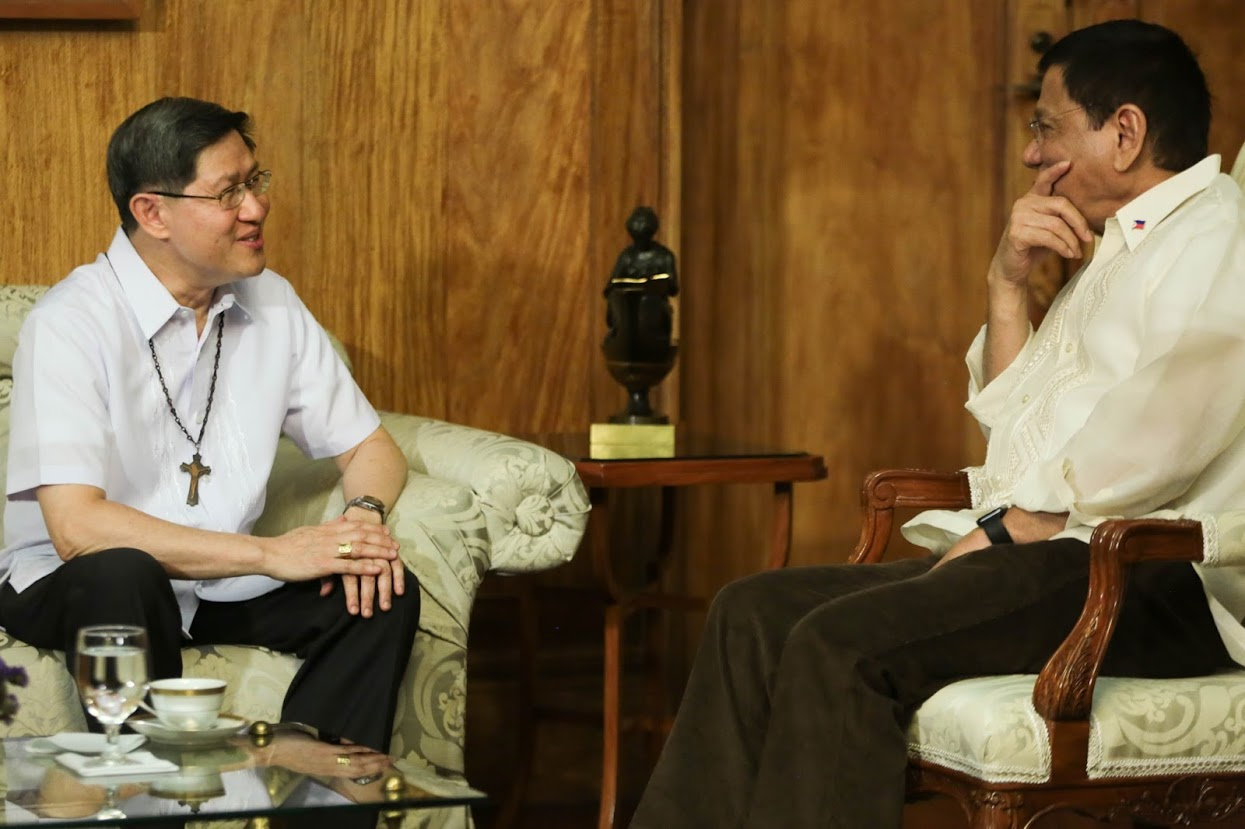
Tagle with Philippine President Rodrigo Duterte in Malacañang Palace in Manila, July 19, 2016

Tagle is a member of the Pontifical Council for the Family, Pontifical Council for the Pastoral Care of Migrants and Itinerant People, Pontifical Council for the Laity, and XIII Ordinary Council of the Secretariat General of the Synod of Bishops. On July 11, 2015, he was made a member of the Pontifical Council 'Cor Unum'. He was also confirmed by Pope Francis as president of the Catholic Biblical Federation on March 5, 2015. On May 14, 2015, he was elected president of Caritas International replacing Cardinal Oscar Rodriguez Maradiaga.

From May 2015 until the pope's dismissal of the entire top management in November 2022, Tagle served as president of the Caritas Internationalis board, the worldwide umbrella organization of Caritas associations. This action followed an external investigation by an independent external commission. According to the Vatican, the investigation found that while financial management was "sound" and donation targets were being met, there was room for improvement in administrative rules and procedures. According to an agency report, a "climate of bullying, fear and ritual humiliation" was blamed on the outgoing secretary general and the board. Tagle was not considered responsible for this, but he also hadn't gotten the problems under control.

Tagle served as chairman for the Episcopal Commission on the Doctrine of Faith within the Catholic Bishops' Conference of the Philippines. He taught dogmatic synthesis at the Graduate School of Theology of San Carlos Seminary, the archdiocesan major seminary of Manila, and systematic theology at the Loyola School of Theology of Ateneo de Manila University. He also taught at the school of theology of the Divine Word Seminary in Tagaytay.

Tagle served as archbishop of Manila until he assumed the position as prefect of the Congregation for the Evangelization of Peoples on February 9, 2020. While awaiting for the date of assuming his new position, he served as the apostolic administrator of the metropolitan see on his last two months as archbishop of Manila from December 8, 2019, to February 9, 2020. Auxiliary Bishop Broderick Pabillo temporarily headed the Archdiocese as apostolic administrator from February 9, 2020. On March 25, 2021, Pope Francis named Capiz Archbishop Cardinal Jose Advincula to succeed Tagle as Archbishop of Manila. Advincula was then installed as Tagle's successor on June 24, 2021.

== Roman Curia (2020–present) ==
Pope Francis named Tagle prefect of the Congregation for the Evangelization of Peoples on December 8, 2019. Tagle is the second Asian to head that congregation, following Cardinal Ivan Dias, who was prefect from 2006 to 2011. He is the second Filipino cardinal to lead a congregation of the Roman Curia after Jose Tomas Sanchez, who headed the Congregation for the Clergy from 1991 to 1996. In March 2020, Philippine President Rodrigo Duterte said the pope had removed Tagle from his post in Manila for channeling church funds to the president's political opponents. The Catholic Bishops' Conference of the Philippines (CBCP) and many individual Philippine prelates denounced Duterte's charge.

Pope Francis promoted him to highest rank of cardinal, cardinal bishop, on May 1, 2020; he is the first Filipino to be included in that rank of the College of Cardinals. In the same way as Cardinals Parolin, Sandri, Ouellet and Filoni, he was not appointed to a suburbicarian see, a break with tradition and canon law section 350.

On September 10, 2020, Tagle tested positive for COVID-19 upon his arrival in Manila. He was the first head of a Vatican dicastery, as well as the fifth Filipino bishop, to test positive for COVID-19. He had tested negative for the virus in Rome on September 7. He was asymptomatic and was in isolation. Tagle remained asymptomatic and ended his quarantine on September 23.

Tagle was appointed as the pro-prefect for the Section of Evangelization of the Dicastery for Evangelization. Due to the enforcement of the Apostolic Constitution Praedicate Evangelium on June 5, 2022, many changes have been made to the Roman Curia. The new Dicastery of Evangelization was formed as a merger of the Congregation for the Evangelization of Peoples and the Pontifical Council for Promoting the New Evangelization. According to the new apostolic constitution, this new dicastery is directly headed by the supreme pontiff as its prefect, while being assisted with two pro-prefects, one of which is Tagle.

Tagle was inducted to the Legion of Honour at Villa Bonaparte on February 15, 2024, by French ambassador to the Holy See Florence Mangin, who gave him the insignia for the rank of "Officer". Tagle received the award in the presence of Philippine ambassador to the Holy See Myla Grace Ragenia C. Macahilig, Gerard Timoner III, Nathaniel Imperial and Gregory Ramon Gaston. Pope Francis appointed Tagle as his special envoy to the 10th National Eucharistic Congress, held from July 17–21, 2024. He celebrated the closing Mass in Lucas Oil Stadium with approximately 50,000 people in attendance.

Following the death of Pope Francis on April 21, 2025, Tagle, at age 67, was one of the three cardinal electors from the Philippines, alongside Cardinals Jose Advincula and Pablo Virgilio David, in the ensuing conclave. He was also third in seniority among the cardinal electors. As in the 2013 conclave, Tagle was considered as a papabile to succeed Francis, as well as the progressive frontrunner. According to reports, Tagle did reasonably well in the first round of voting, but finished well behind Cardinal Pietro Parolin, the Vatican's secretary of state, considered the frontrunner, and Robert Prevost, who was still largely unknown to the public but was finally elected in the fourth round. However, a recently-published book, The Election of Pope Leo XIV: The Last Surprise of Pope Francis, suggests that Tagle got only a few votes, much behind Parolin and Prevost. There was a suspicion that both Parolin and Tagle did not appear to many fellow cardinals to be assertive enough to solve the Vatican's problems, especially of a financial nature. Both have been criticized for failing to properly implement reforms in dealing with sexual abuse cases, although the Philippine bishops denied this shortly before the conclave. Tagle's dismissal by the pope in 2022, because he had proven incapable of cleaning up the dysfunctional bureaucratic apparatus at Caritas International, did not benefit him either.

On top of that, Tagle was also exposed to a cross-shot in the last minute, which intended to stop the supposed progressive frontrunner: As part of a campaign by ultraconservative politicians and Catholics to elect a conservative pope, a video of Tagle singing along to an instrumental rendition of John Lennon's "Imagine", a song notable for its opening verses being critical of religion, was resurfaced by LifeSiteNews. The rendition has since been revealed to be an abridged version where he skipped the opening verses and begun at the chorus, as well as replacing the line "A brotherhood of man" with "A brotherhood for all" in the final verse.

In accordance with paragraph 14 of Universi Dominici gregis and Article 18 of Praedicate evangelium, his term as pro-prefect of the Dicastery for Evangelization ceased at the moment of the pope's death; his term was renewed provisionally by Pope Leo XIV following his election. Tagle told Il Messaggero that, as he perceived the future pope to be tense in the last round of voting, he offered him a candy. As he had said in the past, Tagle described the newly-elected pope as "very human, very humble, but very insightful". Tagle, representing the cardinal bishops, placed the Ring of the Fisherman on Pope Leo's hand during his inauguration Mass on May 18, 2025.

On May 24 2025, Pope Leo XIV assigned Tagle the title of the suburbicarian diocese of Albano, a title Leo held for three months before becoming pope. As announced by the Office for the Liturgical Celebrations of the Supreme Pontiff on October 3, he took canonical possession of his titular suburbicarian diocese on October 11.

Tagle served as the extraordinary legate for Pope Leo XIV in the Mass for the beatification of Fulton J. Sheen, which took place in St. Louis, Missouri on September 24, 2026.

On October 9 2026, Tagle was confirmed by Leo XIV as the Dean of the College of Cardinals, as announced by the Holy See Press Office, after being elected by the cardinal-bishops. As such, he is the Primus inter pares (first among equals) among the other cardinals, and, as senior cardinal bishop, he is able to preside over a future conclave before his 80th birthday in 2037. He is the third non-European cardinal to be elected to that office, after Cardinal Agnelo Rossi of Brazil and Cardinal Bernardin Gantin of Benin.

Tagle has been appointed by popes to serve as member of various discasteries in the Roman Curia:

- Dicastery for the Laity, Family and Life (since 2013/2014)
- Dicastery for Culture and Education (since 2013)
- Dicastery for Institutes of Consecrated Life and Societies of Apostolic Life (since 2014)
- Dicastery for Interreligious Dialogue (since 2020)
- Dicastery for Legislative Texts (since 2020)
- Commission of Cardinals for the Supervision of the Institute for the Works of Religion (since 2020)
- Dicastery for the Eastern Churches (since 2021)
- Administration of the Patrimony of the Apostolic See (since 2021)
- Dicastery for Divine Worship and the Discipline of the Sacraments (since 2022)
- Council for the Section for Relations with States and International Organizations of the Secretariat of State (Holy See)
- Dicastery for Communication (since 2026)

He also participated in eight assemblies of the Synod of Bishops in the Catholic Church, namely:

- Special Assembly for Asia (1998)
- XI General Assembly (Eucharist) (2005)
- XII General Assembly (Word of God) (2008)
- XIII General Assembly (New Evangelization) (2012)
- III Extraordinary General Assembly (family) (2014)
- XIV General Assembly (family) (2015)
- XV General Assembly (Youth) (2018)
- XVI General Assembly (Synodality) (2023–2024)

== Notable views ==
Tagle favors allowing divorced and remarried Catholics to receive Holy Communion on a case-by-case basis, has expressed inclusion for gay Catholics, and supports the 2018 Vatican–China agreement, which allows the pope to appoint and veto bishops approved by the Chinese Communist Party. Tagle advocates for the protection of immigrants and has criticized the preferential treatment of Christians in refugee resettlement programs within Western nations, arguing that it amounts to discrimination.

=== Inclusivity ===
In a March 2015 interview, he said the Catholic Church needed to develop a new language for addressing gay people, unwed mothers, and divorced and remarried Catholics because "what constituted in the past an acceptable way of showing mercy" changes and needs to be re-imagined. Tagle said:

[T]he harsh words that were used in the past to refer to gays and divorced and separated people, the unwed mothers etc., in the past they were quite severe. Many people who belonged to those groups were branded and that led to their isolation from the wider society. ... But we are glad to see and hear shifts in that. ... [F]or the Catholic Church, there is a pastoral approach which happens in counselling, in the sacrament of reconciliation where individual persons and individual cases are taken uniquely or individually so that a help, a pastoral response, could be given adequately to the person.

In the same interview, Tagle said that "Every situation for those who are divorced and remarried is quite unique. To have a general rule might be counterproductive in the end. ... We cannot give one formula for all." In 2017, Tagle led the Lazarus Project, a social media campaign for Easter which called for greater acceptance of people traditionally judged such as sex workers, the homeless, and LGBTQ people in Catholic churches using the hashtag #ResurrectLove.

=== Foreign policy ===
Tagle supports the 2018 Vatican–China agreement, which allows the pope to appoint and veto bishops approved by the Chinese Communist Party, asserting that the Holy See signed the agreement "to safeguard the valid apostolic succession and the sacramental nature of the Catholic Church in China ... and this can reassure, comfort, and enliven baptized Catholics in China."

=== Migration and immigration ===
Tagle has advocated for better treatment of migrants, remarking in 2018 to the United Nations:

Migration is about human persons. I have observed that some people who are afraid of migrants or refugees have had very little personal encounter with them. They do not even know the people they fear. By meeting them, touching their wounds, listening to their stories and dreams, we might see ourselves in them. They are not strangers. They could be me, my parents, my brothers and sisters, my friend.

Tagle has denounced the preferential option for Christians in refugee resettlement programs, noting that any policy prioritizing Christians generates animosity and biases between Muslims and Christians.

=== Interpretation of Vatican II ===
Tagle served from 1995 to 2001 as one of more than 50 members of the editorial board of the five-volume, 2,500-page History of Vatican II. Completed after discussions at 14 international conferences with contributions from over 100 scholars, it is seen as the seminal work on the Second Vatican Council. Its principal editors, Alberto Melloni and Giuseppe Alberigo, are identified with the Bologna School of ecclesiastical history which views Vatican II as a "rupture" with the past. Tagle's contribution, written in 1999 when he was not yet a bishop, was a 66-page chapter in the fourth volume of the History called "A November Storm: The 'Black Week'" which covered the final days of the council's third session in 1964, when several actions by Pope Paul VI caused alarm among reform forces.

Tagle's work has been criticized from opposite viewpoints. In 2005, Archbishop Agostino Marchetto, Secretary of the Pontifical Council for the Pastoral Care of Migrants and Itinerants, a "continuity" advocate, assessed Tagle's chapter as "a rich and even comprehensive study", but called it "unbalanced, journalistic, and lacking objectivity expected of a true historian". Hans Küng, a principal critic of Pope Paul's conservative impact on the council, endorsed Tagle's view that the Roman Curia's influence on the pope forced the Council documents to make "theological compromises", but said Tagle was unable to develop an explanation or justification for Pope Paul's positions, so that "in the closing section his writing degenerates into sanctimoniousness". (Note: Küng's memoir appeared first in German in 2002 and refers to Tagle only as L. A. G. Tagle from the Philippines. He may not have known when writing that Tagle had been named a bishop.)

John L. Allen Jr., a Vaticanologist, reported that Cardinal Marc Ouellet (the Holy See's prefect for the Congregation for Bishops and protégé of Pope Benedict XVI) maintains his "full support" for Tagle. Allen also reported that a Vatican official indicated that he read Tagle's 1999 essay—after media reports highlighted it—and found nothing objectionable. In fact, he was impressed by Tagle's defense of Paul VI in that Tagle wrote that Paul followed a strategy of "listening to all views, especially opposing ones", and was willing to "sacrifice his personal popularity to save the council and its future". This official also said that it is difficult to suggest Tagle is opposed to Pope Benedict's reading of the council since one of the sources Tagle cited was the writings of Joseph Ratzinger. The Vatican news analyst Sandro Magister reported that Tagle's identification with the Bologna School would have hurt his chances of becoming a bishop had the members of the Congregation for Bishops – who considered Tagle's candidacy for archbishop – known of it when considering his appointment.

In a 2012 interview, Tagle maintained that the Council represented no rupture in the magisterium of the Roman Catholic Church. He added that he does not subscribe to the "rupture theory" that the Catholic Church before 1962 is disconnected from the present church. Tagle's views on Vatican II have influenced his views on Islam and atheism, commenting in 2018 that "Vatican II stressed that we Catholics should respect non-Catholics and their religions. We also respect those who do not believe in God. All people should strive to respect those who differ from their beliefs."

== Media ==
Since after becoming Bishop of Imus, later as archbishop of Manila, and further as a Vatican pro-prefect, Tagle continues to host The Word Exposed and The Faith Exposed, both Catholic television programs produced by the Jesuit Communications Foundation, which also maintains official social media accounts for him. He is also the Tuesday presenter of Kape't Pandasal ("Coffee and Prayer", a pun on the Filipino term kape't pandesal or "coffee and salted bread"), an early morning religious inspirational program partly produced by the same media arm, broadcast on TV Maria, DepEd ALS, Bilyonaryo News Channel, and previously on ABS-CBN, and now streaming in YouTube.

== Coat of arms ==
Coat of arms of Cardinal Luis Antonio Tagle

Cardinal Tagle's episcopal motto remains Dominus Est ("It is the Lord!"), drawn from the Gospel of John 21:7. The updated coat of arms of Tagle retains all the principal elements previously found on the sinister side of his arms during his tenure as archbishop of Manila. Following his transition to new ecclesiastical responsibilities, the arms of the Archdiocese are no longer depicted. The new version of the coat of arms adopts a different marshalling (division) to ensure to a heraldically correct arrangement of elements. The coat of arms is parted tierced (in three parts) per pall reversed. In the dexter (heraldic right) field, which is rendered in gold (Or), there is an open Bible bearing the Greek letters Alpha (Α) and Omega (Ω) in black (Sable). Beside the Bible is the image of the Good Shepherd, shown in natural colors (Proper), carrying a sheep upon his shoulders and holding a wooden staff in his right hand. A fishing net is suspended from the shepherd's right arm, extending downward, with five fish entangled within it.

The sinister (heraldic left) field, colored blue (Azure), features a Corinthian column rising from the base. The column is topped with the crowned monogram of the Blessed Virgin Mary, depicted in white (Argent) and encircled by twelve golden stars. This imagery alludes to Our Lady of the Pillar, the patroness of Tagle's home parish and diocese. In contrast to his previous coat of arms, which featured an Ionic column, the updated version uses a Corinthian style, matching the column found at Piazza di Spagna in Rome, near the offices of the Congregation for the Evangelization of Peoples, where Tagle serves as prefect. The base of the shield, colored green (Vert), bears a gold (Or) carpenter's square superimposed upon two white (Argent) lilies with stalks and leaves, symbolizing purity and Saint Joseph, the carpenter. Behind the shield is an archiepiscopal cross, and above both is a red (Gules) galero, or ecclesiastical hat, with fifteen red tassels suspended on each side, arranged in rows of one, two, three, four, and five.

The coat of arms is blasoned as follows: Tierced per pall reversed Or, Azure and Vert. In dexter side, arranged in fess, an open Bible inscribed with the Greek letters Α and Ω Sable, and an image of the Good Shepherd Proper carrying a sheep upon his shoulders and holding a wooden staff Proper in his dexter hand, a net Sable, sinister chief point suspended from the dexter arm of the Good Shepherd and the dexter fesse point to the base, five fishes Sable entangled in the net. Issuing out of the base of sinister side, a Corinthian Pillar Or surmounted by the monogram of the Blessed Virgin Mary Argent, crowned and encircled by twelve stars, all of the first. In base, a Carpenter's square Or superimposed on two lilies stalked and leaved, all of the fifth. Behind the shield is an archepiscopal cross. Both are surmounted by a galero with fifteen tassels pendant from both sides in 1, 2, 3, 4 and 5, all Gules.

== Distinctions ==
=== Orders ===
- Holy See: Order of the Holy Sepulchre
- France: Officer of the Order of the Legion of Honour (2024)

=== Academic ===
- Far Eastern University: doctor of humane letters honoris causa (April 2002)
- San Beda College: doctor of humane letters honoris causa (March 30, 2012)
- De La Salle University – Dasmariñas: doctor of humane letters honoris causa (June 19, 2013)
- Xavier University – Ateneo de Cagayan: doctor of humane letters honoris causa (August 1, 2013)
- University of Santo Tomas: doctor of humane letters honoris causa (August 13, 2013)
- Holy Angel University: doctor of humane letters honoris causa (August 16, 2013)
- Fordham University: doctor of humane letters honoris causa (March 28, 2014)
- Australian Catholic University: doctor of humane letters honoris causa (May 17, 2014)
- The Catholic University of America: doctor of theology honoris causa (May 17, 2014)
- Catholic Theological Union: doctor of theology honoris causa (May 14, 2015)
- La Salle University: doctor of humane letters honoris causa (September 18, 2015)
- Ateneo de Manila University: doctor of philosophy honoris causa (June 21, 2024)

=== Awards ===
- Outstanding Manilan 2013
- Fides Award 2015
- Brother Teliow Fackeldey, FSC Presidential Medal Award for Outstanding Integrity, Merit and Public Service 2015
- Ford Family Notre Dame Award for Human Development and Solidarity 2017
- Rotary Peace Award 2018
- Father Hecker Award for Excellence in Evangelization 2020
- Catholic Faith Network Religious Leader Award 2024

== Bibliography ==
=== News articles ===
- Lawler, Phil (December 11, 2019). "Who is most likely to succeed Pope Francis?". Catholic Culture. Archived from the original on January 3, 2021.
- Magister, Sandro (December 11, 2019). "Conclave Rehearsals. The Next Pope Will Take His Name From Sant'Egidio". Archived from the original on October 1, 2021.

=== Books ===
- Cindy Wooden (Catholic News Service), Leading by Listening, Liturgical Press, Collegeville, Minnesota (August 1, 2015). ISBN 9780814637173, OCLC 922701045 (interview book)

Catholic Church titles
Preceded by Manuel Sobreviñas	Bishop of Imus; 22 October 2001 – 12 December 2011	Succeeded by Reynaldo Evangelista
Preceded by Gaudencio Rosales	Archbishop of Manila; 12 December 2011 – 9 February 2020	Succeeded by Jose Advincula Jr.
Preceded by Stephen Kim Sou-hwan	Cardinal Priest of San Felice da Cantalice a Centocelle; 24 November 2012 – 1 May 2020	Succeeded by Himself as Cardinal Bishop
Preceded by Himself as Cardinal Priest	Cardinal Bishop of San Felice da Cantalice a Centocelle; 1 May 2020 – 24 May 2025	Title abolished
Preceded by Oscar Andrés Rodríguez Maradiaga	President of Caritas Internationalis; 15 May 2015 – 22 November 2022	Succeeded by Pier Francesco Pinelli
Preceded by Fernando Filoni	Prefect of the Congregation for the Evangelization of Peoples; 8 December 2019 – 5 June 2022	Office suppressed
Preceded by Fernando Filoni	President of the Interdicasterial Commission for Consecrated Religious; 8 December 2019 –	Incumbent
Preceded by Fernando Filoni	Grand Chancellor of the Pontifical Urbaniana University; 8 December 2019 –	Incumbent
Office established	Pro-Prefect for the Section of First Evangelization and New Particular Churches of the Dicastery for Evangelization; 5 June 2022 –	Incumbent
Preceded by Robert Francis Prevost	Cardinal Bishop of Albano; 24 May 2025 –	Incumbent
Preceded by Giovanni Battista Re	Cardinal Bishop of Ostia; 9 October 2026 –	Incumbent
Preceded by Giovanni Battista Re	Dean of the College of Cardinals; 9 October 2026 –	Incumbent
