= D. S. Amalorpavadass =

Catholic South-Indian theologian

Servant of God D. S. Amalorpavadass
- Archdiocese: Archdiocese of Pondicherry and Cuddalore

Orders
- Ordination: 12 April 1959

Personal details
- Born: 15 June 1932 Kallery, Villupuram district, Tamil Nadu
- Died: 25 May 1990 (aged 57) Mysore, Karnataka
- Buried: Anjali Ashram
- Occupation: Theologian

Rev. Fr. Duraiswami Simon Amalorpavadass (15 June 1932 – 25 May 1990) was a Catholic South-Indian theologian who played a vital role in the renewal of life and mission of the Roman Catholic Church in India, particularly after Vatican II. He was fluent in Tamil, French and English. He was the younger brother of Cardinal Lourdusamy.

Rev. Stephen Bevans, S.V.D., in a paper presented to celebrate 30 years of Evangelii nuntiandi, writes that Amalorpavadass, one of the two special secretaries on the 1974 Synod of Bishops ("Evangelization in the Modern World"), convened by Pope Paul VI, "attempted to propose an interpretation that took into account many of the important movements in Asia and other parts of the Third World. His ideas revolved

around a greater role for the local church and the emergence of the theology of liberation".

Amalorpavadass was a member of the Ecumenical Association of Third World Theologians (EATWOT).

== Early years ==
Amalorpavadass was born in Kallery, a village in the Viluppuram district of Tamil Nadu, on 15 June 1932.

He had been a student of St Anne's High School, Tindivanam and St. Joseph's Higher Secondary School, Cuddalore.

== Seminary studies and ordination ==
Amalorpavadass studied at the St Agnes Minor Seminary in Cuddalore and later graduated from St Joseph's College, Tiruchirappalli

In 1953 Amalorpavadass joined St. Peter's Pontifical Seminary in Malleswaram, Bangalore.

After his completion of theological studies in Bangalore he was ordained on 12 April 1959 as a priest of the Archdiocese of Pondicherry and Cuddalore.

He served in the parishes of the Archdiocese before being appointed to The Regional Catechetical Centre of the archdiocese to animate and coordinate the work of the centre for the South Indian state of Tamil Nadu.

== Post-graduate studies and research ==
In 1962 Fr. Amalorpavadass was sent by his bishop to Paris, France to the Catholic University of Paris (Institut Catholique de Paris) to pursue a degree in catechetics. In addition to completing his master's degree, he also became very proficient in French.

Continuing his stay in Paris he enrolled as a candidate at the same institute to pursue a Doctorate of Theology degree. His doctoral dissertation was entitled Destiny of the Church in India today.

After completing his master's degree and doctorate studies he returned to India, in 1966, and was assigned a parish role in Viriyur in order to gain pastoral experience.

=== National Biblical, Catechetical and Liturgical Centre ===
Fr. Amalorpavadass founded the National Biblical, Catechetical and Liturgical Centre (NBCLC), Hutchins Road, Bangalore on 6 February 1967 at the invitation of the CBCI. He was the Director from its inception in 1967 till 1982. He worked to renew the Church in India and implement all that was envisioned by Vatican II. This was often done through his training of bishops, priests, sisters, laity all over India and through his writing.

He initiated scholarly discussions and invited the learned scholars of India including Victor Premasagar and K. David the then members of faculty of the ecumenical Andhra Christian Theological College in Hyderabad.

==== Word and Worship ====
The liturgical journal "Word and Worship" was started during the period of Father Amalalorpavadass.

==== Initiatives at the University of Mysore ====
===== Chair of Christianity =====
The University of Mysore, the first university in Karnataka (established in 1916 by the Maharaja of Mysore, N. Krishna Wodeyar) instituted a chair in Christianity with substantial endowment from the Catholic Diocese of Mysore in 1979. Amalorpavadass was visiting professor in the chair.

===== Department of Christianity =====
Later, in 1981, a Department of Christian Studies (the first of its kind in India) was established by Amalorpavadass for promoting advanced studies and research in Christianity in the secular, multi-religious, interdisciplinary and pluralistic context of India in order to promote Christianity as an academic and scientific discipline Amalorpavadass headed the department for a while.

==== Anjali Ashram ====
While Fr. Amalorpavadass was in Mysore, he founded a Christian ashram and named it "Anjali Ashram" and served as an Acharya-Guru for thousands of seekers from all walks of life, including bishops, priests, nuns, lay people from India and abroad, till his death in 1990.

The name "Anjali" was adopted to illustrate the hospitality and love with which everyone was received in the ashram.

In the first week or according to the need of every month, the ashram offers Atma Purna Anubhava (APA);– introduction to Indian Christian spirituality, and the second deeper experience 'Brahma Sakshatkara Anubhava' (BSA) for those who have participated in the first experience and keep practising their sadhana as and when required. Guruji Amalor had initiated 60 APA's and 6 BSA's during his time and now Swami Gnanajyothi(Fr.A. Louis) the present Guru continues his mission. It is now 233 APA's so far from 1984 and 7 BSA's.

Anjali ashram has a unique architectural design. The entrance to the ashram is marked by wide open entrance without a gate(openness to all) which leads to Viswagopuram and an outer mandapa without walls meant for yoga, upadesa and dialogue meetings. On both sides of this mandapa, there are two footpaths in a curved fashion taking you to the inner area directly. If you walk directly through the mandapa, you pass through Swagata Nilaya – welcome abode and reach another structure(Atma Purna Nivas) used for meditations and prayer meetings. Then comes the residences for inmates like Dasavatara cottages, Star shaped Buildings, pyramidal buildings, Om Building, Yin Yang and the 24 hermitages. There are trees Peepal tree( morning samdhya) Fig tree (Noon samdhya) and Banyan trees (for upadesas). Then comes the sanctum. The last building is the sanctum sanctorum containing the Satcitananda Mandir within which the samadhi of the Founder is found.. The small cottages for the inmates are built on either sides of the sanctum sanctorum. There is a footpath that takes you directly to the other gate from the sanctum sanctorum. Beyond it is found Ashtabhagya gopuram inviting everyone either to sing kirtana (praises) or be in mauna(silence). Still beyond is the Navagrahavana forest of nine planets.

== Appraisal ==
- Cardinal Cleemis on February 5, 2016 as Chairman of the Catholic Bishops' Conference of India (CBCI) -
  The establishment of NBCLC was a praiseworthy attempt from the part of the Church to truly incarnate the Word of God and the traditions of the Church. It is worthy to recall that the CBCI entrusted this herculean task to an able and admirable priest, Rev. Fr. D.S. Amalorpavadass, who was not only gifted but also had the required scientific training as well as the touch of the Spirit. We now recall his great contributions that made the National Biblical Catechetical and Liturgical Center (NBCLC), a sure guide in post-Vatican renewal. His insightful leadership of this Centre helped it to climb to greater heights and during his tenure, NBCLC became one of the most known ecclesiastical institutions in India.
- Cardinal Malcolm Ranjith, Archbishop of Colombo, Sri Lanka:
  As a young seminarian I first heard about the Cardinal Lourdusamy back in the late 1960s from the Bishops of Sri Lanka who participated in the Second Vatican Council. They spoke glowingly of the Cardinal and his contributions towards the decisions of the Council. His Eminence’s brother Fr. D.S. Amalorpavadass was even better known in Asia as a post Councilar Asian Theological mind of great value.
- Cardinal Wilfrid Napier, OFM – Archbishop of Durban, South Africa:
  I attended the workshop by the Federation of Asian Bishops Conferences in their social action programme called BISAVI (Bishops Initiative for Social Action) in Thailand in 1986. I was surprised to discover that the priest dressed in saffron robes as he delivered a very inspired and inspiring talk on inculturating the Gospel, Fr. Amalorpavadass, was in fact Cardinal Lourdusamy's brother. What a contrast! What an amazing proof that God's grace is always there to surprise and spur us on to the higher and more challenging heights. I found it hard to picture your two uncles growing up and living in the same family, first their blood family and then their faith family.
- Archbishop Bernard Moras as Archbishop of Bangalore, India:
  Fr. Amalor was not just another Indian guru; we can truly call him an Indian Christian Prophet, who challenged and educated the Church in India to grow and become mature and authentic, relevant, and effectively through the process of inculturation. His personality and lifestyle as well as his words and actions were great examples of inculturated living. He believed that the Church should become creative and responsible and be present in India as authentically Indian and passionately Christian. According to him only an inculturated Indian Church, i.e., a Church that is incarnated in the Indian culture and has penetrated the heart of India, can live and thrive as the sacrament of Christ and the evangelizer of salvation.
- Archbishop Michael Augustine, Archbishop Emeritus of Pondicherry, India
  "Only when is no longer afraid to die, is one no longer afraid at all. Any only when we are no longer afraid, do we begin to live in every experience, painful or joyous; to live in gratitude for every moment, to live abundantly" (Dorothy Thompson). This, in a nut-shell, is what Fr. Amalor came to represent for me and the same admiration for 'self-assurance seems to linger with me all my life. He was not afraid to die. He was not afraid to face stiff opposition, pain and sorrow. He was fully involved in every moment and in every action, responding to all that came his way with calm and serene composure. He rather composed himself in a `studied' manner, as if conscious of his calling to the role of prophet.
- Archbishop Jacob Thoomkuzhy, Archbishop Emeritus of Trichur, India
  In the history of the Church in India, one may, without hesitation state that Fr. Amalor was in the center of the 20th century and the central figure radiating great influence on the whole Church in the second half of that century. This thinly bearded lean priest was a genuine Indian Guru, frail from fasting, prayer and yoga. He gave copious lectures on Indian Spirituality, Catechism and Prayer Life, assimilating the Spirit of ancient Indian spirituality. He advocated and practiced adaptation of Liturgy to Indian Culture faithful to the reforms of Vatican II Council. He shared the same thru prolific and profound writings. Had Fr. Amalor lived longer, our Indian Church would have acquired a beautiful Indian Liturgy. I remember with joy the seminars I attended in Bangalore. Fr. Amalor was a great man, exceptional personality, with scarcely anyone to compare with. In his short span of life, he rendered enormous service to the Church. May the Lord who cannot be outdone in generosity recompense him.
- Bishop Thomas Dabre of Pune, India as Chairman of the CBCI Commission for the NBCLC:
  ....the pioneering, defining and visionary role of Fr. Amalorpavadass as the Founder - Director of NBCLC deserves a special mention with profound gratitude. He was suffused with the vision of the (Vatican II) Council. He certainly was an outstanding and creative thinker - not an ivory-tower one - who was passionately committed to his mission and traversed the length and breadth of this vast sub-continent to ensure the faithful implementation of the programme of the Council.
- Bishop Bosco Puthur, Bishop of St. Thomas The Apostle Syro Malabar Diocese, Melbourne, Australia
  As Assistant Director of Diocesan Catechism Department for Trichur diocese, I participated in a national catechetical seminar in NBCLC in 1976, conducted by Fr. Amalor. Spell bound I listened to him. His personality greatly impressed me. His vision for the Church renewal captivated me. Like a master magician he mesmerised his audience, including me. At my request, Bishop Joseph Kundukulam in 1967 invited Fr. Amalor for two seminars on Self Renewal and Church Renewal for the entire clergy of the Diocese of Trichur. It was a huge success. The clergy of the diocese was so enthused by the seminar that the Diocese celebrated 1978 as “renewal year”. Now in Australia I am often surprised to hear from several priests that they still remember the inspiring lectures of Fr. Amalor.
- Bishop J. Kingley Swampillai, Bishop Emeritus of Trincomalee and Current Administrator of the Diocese of Mannar, Sri Lanka:
  Fr. Lourdusamy had become an Auxiliary Bishop, Coadjutor Bishop and Archbishop of Bangalore. There he also served as Chairman of the Liturgical and Catechetical Commission of the Catholic Bishops Conference of India (CBCI). There he was joined by his brother Fr. Amalorpavadass who, at the request of the CBCI, founded the National Biblical, Catechetical and Liturgical Centre (NBCLC). Both brothers, who were chosen by God in a special way and imbued with the gifts of the Holy Spirit, and spearheaded the Vatican Council teachings in the process of “aggiornamento” and set it on fire all over India and especially in the South where Bangalore is located. Bishop Lourdusamy had also attended Vatican II Council as a Council Father. In fact, the monumental Institution in Bangalore, India, called 'NBCLC” is like a beacon of Catholic teaching for Priests, Religious and lay leaders of India as well as Asia.
- Msgr. A. Louis, Episcopal Vicar, Archdiocese of Pondicherry - Cuddalore and Guru of Anjali Ashram:
  "The ever loving God led Amalor gradually but surely from home to the diocese, from the diocese to the region, from the region to the nation, from the nation to the entire creation, as a co-pilgrim, journeying with the seekers towards the ultimate goal of self-realization and the reign of God. The pilgrimage had the added support of Anjali Ashram from 1979 to 1990."
- Stephen Bevans, a Divine Word missionary and priest:
  .....attempted to propose an interpretation that took into account many of the important movements in Asia and other parts of the Third World. His ideas revolved around a greater role for the local church and the emergence of the theology of liberation.
- John Prior, a British missiologist:
  .....Amalorpavadass authored "a coherent, comprehensive, contextual theology of mission, drawing in both the bold new ventures of the majority and the questions of the cautionary minority," but his contributions, for all practical purposes, were ignored by the persons responsible for the official draft that was to come before the bishops in the synod's final days. Amalorpavadass, when he realised this, had his own version duplicated and distributed among the bishops, who, when comparing it to the official draft, refused to approve it when it came to the final vote. It was four days before the closing of the Synod, and there was no time to write and then discuss another draft. It was then, as Cardinal Moreira Neves recalls, that Cardinal Karol Wojtyla suggested that "the Synod's recommendations be entrusted to the Pope so that he could transform them into the Synod's final document." The result was Evangelii nuntiandi.
  Prior points out that Paul VI's document actually incorporated much of what was in Amalorpavadass’ draft, and so it is a document that is much broader in scope than the document rejected by the bishops at the Synod.
- Joshua Russel Chandran, Past Principal, United Theological College, Millers Road, Bangalore:
  .....In the untimely death of Fr. Amalorvapadass, on 25 May 1990, following a car accident, not only the Church in India but the whole ecumenical world has suffered an irreparable loss. Fr. Amalor, as we used to call him, was a devout Catholic priest, an outstanding scholar and theologian, a committed missionary and evangelist and a warmhearted friend. Many throughout the world mourn his loss, and at the same time praise and thank God for the life and ministry of this great servant of God.
- Catherine Cornille, Associate Professor (Theology Department), Boston College, North America:
  .....Amalorpavadass believed that theoretical study ought to be coupled with and supported by a genuine Christian community life, lived in an Indian tradition, context and atmosphere, following an Indian life-style.
- George Polackal
  Fr. Amalor was right when he advised, "When you welcome what makes you happy, why not welcome what makes you suffer." He advocated for an equanimity of mind in joy and sorrow, pain and pleasure, failure and success. 'Again, while protesting as a prophet, he obeyed as a disciple.' That made him unique...Anjali Ashram Mysore founded by him serves as a spiritual abode for seekers from all walks of life, including bishops, priests, nuns, and laypeople from India and abroad. Their sincere testimonies illustrate how they have been illuminated by God through this Ashram...serving thousands of seekers to get an authentic experience of Indian Christian Spirituality, initiating them to contemplative prayer or deep God experience. ....I witnessed his work twice while he was serving as Founder - Director of NBCLC, Bangalore. How spiritually deep and inspiring he was! How Spirit-filled and a man of vision he was! For him, his life was his message!...It is our heartfelt aspiration that he is anointed a Saint for India, an Apostle of Renewal for the Indian Church...I acknowledge my deep gratitude to Anjali Ashram for kindling in me a spiritual quest through the Atma Purna Anubhava and my several visits to the Ashram.
- Matthew N. Schmalz, Associate Professor, College of the Holy Cross, North America:
  .....the Indian Theologian D. S. Amalorpavadass had the most decisive influence on the inculturation movement. Empowered by the reforms of the Second Vatican Council and a variety of indults ad experimentum, Amalorpavadass envisioned an experimental Indian rite mass that would supplant the imported Roman or Latin rite. Though not approving Amalorpavadass's most radical reforms, the Vatican issued "12 Points of Adaptation," which allowed a variety of accommodations to Indian culture in the Latin rite mass: Priests dressed in ochre robes characteristic of renunciants, and the Bible and the Eucharist were honored through offerings of flowers and incense. Amalorpavadass envisioned these adaptations as bridging the gap between Catholic and Indian identities. Moreover, such adaptations were designed to embrace Indian culture and nationhood. Amalorpavadass and many Indian bishops hoped that Catholicism would no longer be seen as foreign but as very much a part of the Indian nation.
- Michael T. Buchanan, Australian Catholic University:
  .....In the early 1970s Religious educators in Australia were strongly influenced by the Indian theologian Amalorpavadass. He visited Australia in 1973, and his understanding of revelation was a major influence in developing a life-centered pedagogical approach to religious education. He argued that, Revelation calls for faith. Faith is a personal and living encounter with the living God, a total acceptance of the revealing and giving person by a loving surrender of one's life according to His word. All this should result in the sealing of a covenant and the realisation of a fellowship in love. Therefore our inter-personal relationship is one of dialogue, covenant and fellowship. Therefore man's response or reaction to God's revelation will be essentially attention and responsibility, expectation and listening, openness and acceptance, and reciprocal self-gift in a total surrender and dedication of oneself. This is what we call faith.

== Criticism ==
There was some resistance towards inculturation of Catholicism into the Indian context. Matthew N. Schmalz points out that some Indian Catholics resisted inculturation. A few South Indian Catholics took Amalorpavadass to court in vain, since they believed that these adaptations threatened their own distinctive identity.

== Writings ==
Fr. D.S. Amalorpavadass had written and edited numerous volumes. A few of them are:

- Approach, Meaning, and Horizon of Evangelization, NBCLC, Bangalore, 1973
- Gospel and Culture: Evangelisation and Inculturation, NBCLC, Bangalore, 1978
- NBCLC Campus: Milieu of God-Experience. An Artistic Synthesis of Spirituality, NBCLC, Bangalore, 1982
- Poverty of the Religious and the Religious as Poor, NBCLC, Bangalore, 1984
- Integration and Interiorization (1990)

In 1990, Gerwin van Leeuwen brought out a book entitled:

- Fully Indian – authentically Christian: A study of the first fifteen years of the NBCLC (1967–1982), Bangalore, 1990.

In 1994, Cyril de Souza sdb brought out his research entitled:"Catechesis for India Today: An Appraisal of the Catechetical Proposal of D.S. Amalorpavadass", Kristu Jyoti Publications, Bangalore.

- Two memorial volumes came out in 1991:
  - J. Russel Chandran (ed.), Third World Theologies in Dialogue: Essays in Memory of D. S. Amalorpavadass, EATWOT, Bangalore, 1991.
  - Paul Puthanangady ed., Church in India: Institution or Movement ? (1991)

Anjali Ashram has brought out the experience of Atma Purna Anubhava(APA) in 2000 his two doctoral thesis 'India Seeking God' and 'The destiny of the Church in India' in 2004 and Brahma Sakshatkara Anubhava (BSA) in 2004. 'An India Christian Guru' the Biography in 2011 and 2015 on the occasion of his 25th anniversary of mahasamdhi all his mission theology series have been compiled as one volume 'Mission Theology' and other writings as 'In search of Identity'. All his writings on Liturgy, Catechetics and Bible as three separate volumes Biblical Renewal, Liturgical Renewal and Catechetical Renewal. There are four books in Tamil.

== Memberships ==
Fr. Amalorpavadass was constantly in demand and was much sought after. He was very active in many international organizations, including

- Ecumenical Association of Third World Theologians (EATWOT),
- International Commission for English in the liturgy,
- World Catholic Federation for the Biblical Apostolate,
- International Association for Mission Studies (IAMS)
- Secretary, Biblical, Catechetical and Liturgical Commissions of the Catholic Bishop's Conference of India (CBCI).

He was appointed by Pope Paul VI as one of the two special secretaries for the Synod of Bishops on evangelisation in 1974, in the Vatican. The outstanding contributions he made were well recognized as acknowledged above.

== Death ==
Fr. Amalorpavadass (Amalor) died in an automobile accident on his way to Bangalore from Mysore. He is buried at Anjali Ashram. His final services were officiated by his older brother Simon Cardinal Lourdusamy who was then the Prefect of the Congregation for Eastern Rite Churches.

== Cause of beatification and canonization ==
In 2016, Archbishop Antony Anandarayar of the Archdiocese of Pondicherry and Cuddalore submitted a formal petition to the Vatican to open the cause for sainthood for Amalorpavadass. Following multiple appeals by Archbishop Francis Kalist clarifying the process, the Holy See issued a decree of nihil obstat on 15 July 2026. With the opening of the cause, Amalorpavadass was given the title of Servant of God.
