= National Biblical, Catechetical and Liturgical Centre =

- Abbreviation: NBCLC
- Formation: February 6, 1967; 59 years ago
- Founder: D. S. Amalorpavadass
- Type: Religious, Educational
- Headquarters: Bengaluru, Karnataka, India
- Chairman: Mar Pauly Kannookadan (Bishop, Irinjalakuda)
- Director: Antony John Baptist
- Parent organization: Catholic Bishops' Conference of India (CBCI)
- Website: www.nbclcindia.org

National Biblical, Catechetical and Liturgical Centre (NBCLC) is a theological and pastoral formation institute under the auspices of the Catholic Bishops' Conference of India (CBCI). It is located in Bengaluru, Karnataka, India, and serves the Catholic Church in India with a focus on biblical studies, catechetics, and liturgical renewal.

== History ==
NBCLC was founded in the context of the reforms and renewal initiated by the Second Vatican Council. The initiative was led by D. S. Amalorpavadass, who became the first director in October 1966.

The current director of the centre is Antony John Baptist.

The centre was created to respond to the spiritual, liturgical, and catechetical needs of the Indian Catholic Church and continues to serve the Latin Church, Syro-Malabar Church, and Syro-Malankara Catholic Church.

The centre seeks to contextualize the ministry of the Word of God through inculturation and dialogue with Indian religions, cultures, and social realities. It promotes theological education, biblical literacy, and the inculturation of liturgy and catechesis.

== Programs and activities ==
NBCLC organizes retreats, seminars, training courses, and workshops for clergy, religious, and laity across India.
