= Anjali Ashram, Mysore =

Christian retreat in Mysore city in the Karnataka province of India

Coordinates: 12.29080°N 76.68448°E

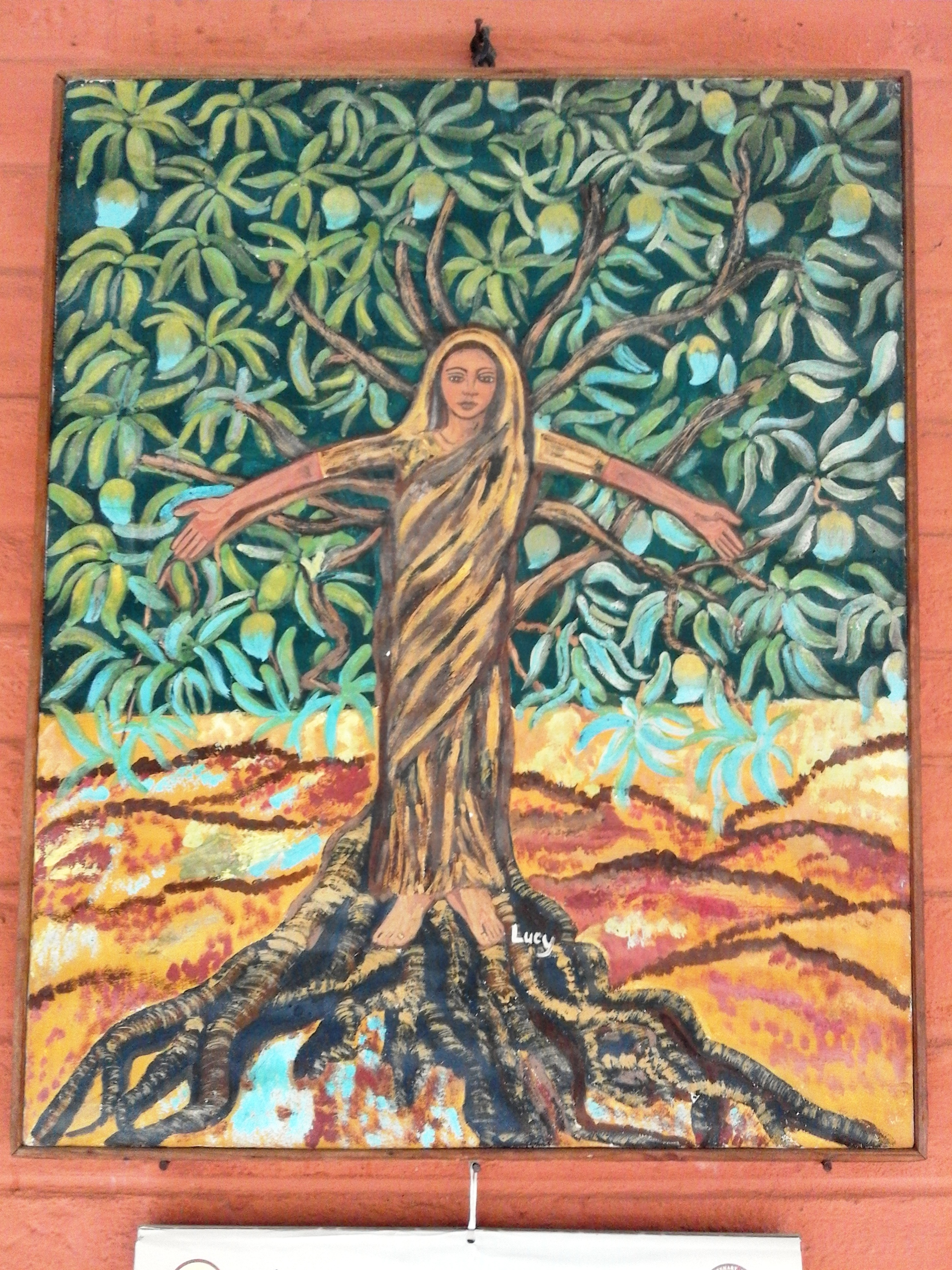
Inside the ashram

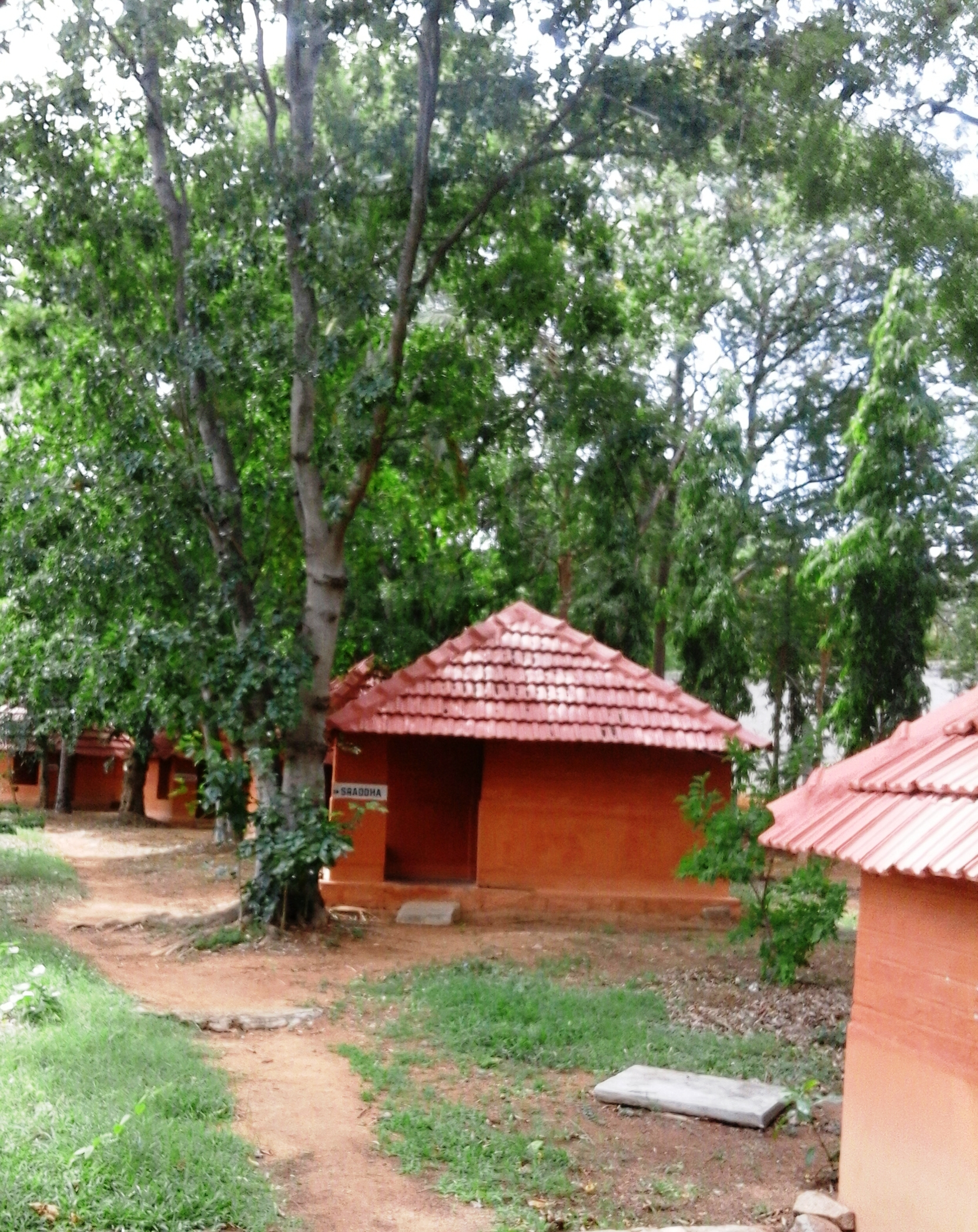
Cottages for meditation

Anjali Ashram is a Christian retreat in Mysore city in the Karnataka province of India.

== Location ==
Anjali Ashram is located on the foot of Chamundi Hills in Mysore. The locality is called J.C.Colony and it is on Chamundi Hill Main road five k.m. from Mysore city.

== History ==
The ashram was founded by Swamy Amalorananda alias Fr.D.S.Amalorpavadass (1979–1990).

== Objectives ==
Anjali Ashram was established with the motive of building a truly multi religious community and to promote a spiritual mode of life. The name Anjali was adopted for the ashram to show that everyone will be welcome inside. In the first week of the month, the ashram conducts spiritual classes on Christianity.

== Facilities ==
The ashram is located on a ten-acre campus. About 100 people can be accommodated at the ashram at a time. There are five buildings, ten cottages, and 24 hermitages inside the campus for the seekers to reside. One building is shaped like 'om' sign and other are like Chinese Yin Yang. The other two buildings are in the shape of a star.

== Routine ==
The inmates of the ashram wake up at 4.30 a.m. and have yoga exercises and a personal prayer. Meditation is at 5.30 a.m. and breakfast is served at 7.30. Volunteer work is done after breakfast and after lunch at 12.30 p.m. There is a spiritual lecture at 4.30 p.m. and dinner is served at 7.30 p.m. Inmates retire to bed by 10.00 p.m.

== Administration ==
The present head of the ashram is Swami Gnanajyothi(Fr.A. Louis) from the Archdiocese of Pondicherry-Cuddalore, assisted by Sr. Mariella. Both of them are disciples of Swami Amalorananda.

== See also ==
- D. S. Amalorpavadass
