= Catholic Biblical Federation =

Religious organization

The Catholic Biblical Federation (CBF) is a worldwide "fellowship" of administratively independent Catholic Bible associations and other organizations committed to biblical-pastoral ministries in 130 countries. It exists primarily to promote and coordinate the work of translating, producing, and disseminating Bibles among Catholic laity for devotional purposes.

The Federation also encourages the formation of small study groups for Bible reading as well as the creation of educational tools for use in these settings. First organized under the name The World Catholic Federation for the Biblical Apostolate in 1969, the Federation shorted its name in 1990 at its fourth Plenary Assembly held in Colombia. With the support of Cardinal Augustino Bea, its establishment was made possible by several provisions concerning lay access to Bibles that were contained in Second Vatican Council documents, especially Dei verbum.

That document called for "easy access" to the Bible for "all the Christian faithful" and opened the way to cooperation with the Interconfessional United Bible Societies, particularly in the work of translation. In 1972 the Federation moved its headquarters from Rome to Stuttgart and in 1986 began publishing the quarterly Bulletin DEI VERBUM. In 2009 the General Seceretariat was moved from Stuttgart to Sankt Ottilien in Germany.

Every six years the Federation holds a Plenary Assembly. The first was held in Austria in 1972 and the most recent from 19 to 23 June 2015 in Nemi. In 1985 the Federation adopted its Constitution which was approved by Rome in accordance with the norms of Canon Law. The Constitution was revised to its present form at the fifth Plenary Assembly held in Hong Kong in 1996 and approved by Rome the following year. The last revision was voted during the Plenary Assembly in Nemi.

The Plenary Assembly is the highest decision-making authority within the Federation and is presided over by the General Secretary and an Executive Committee. The General Secretary is elected by the Executive Committee for a six-year renewable term. The Executive Committee consists of three ex officio members, including the General Secretary, as well as six voting members. Of this latter group members are drawn from each of the Federation's four sub-regions: Africa, the Americas, Asia/Oceania, and Europe/the Middle East. Jan J. Stefanów SVD has been General Secretary since January 2014. The appointment of Cardinal Luis Antonio Tagle of Manila as its President was confirmed by the Vatican on March 5, 2015.

== See also ==
- Catholic Bible
- Dei verbum
- Second Vatican Council
