= Felix Wilfred =

Indian Roman Catholic theologian

Felix Wilfred (21 February 1948 — 7 January 2025) was a Roman Catholic theologian, known for his work in Asian liberation theology.

== Biography ==
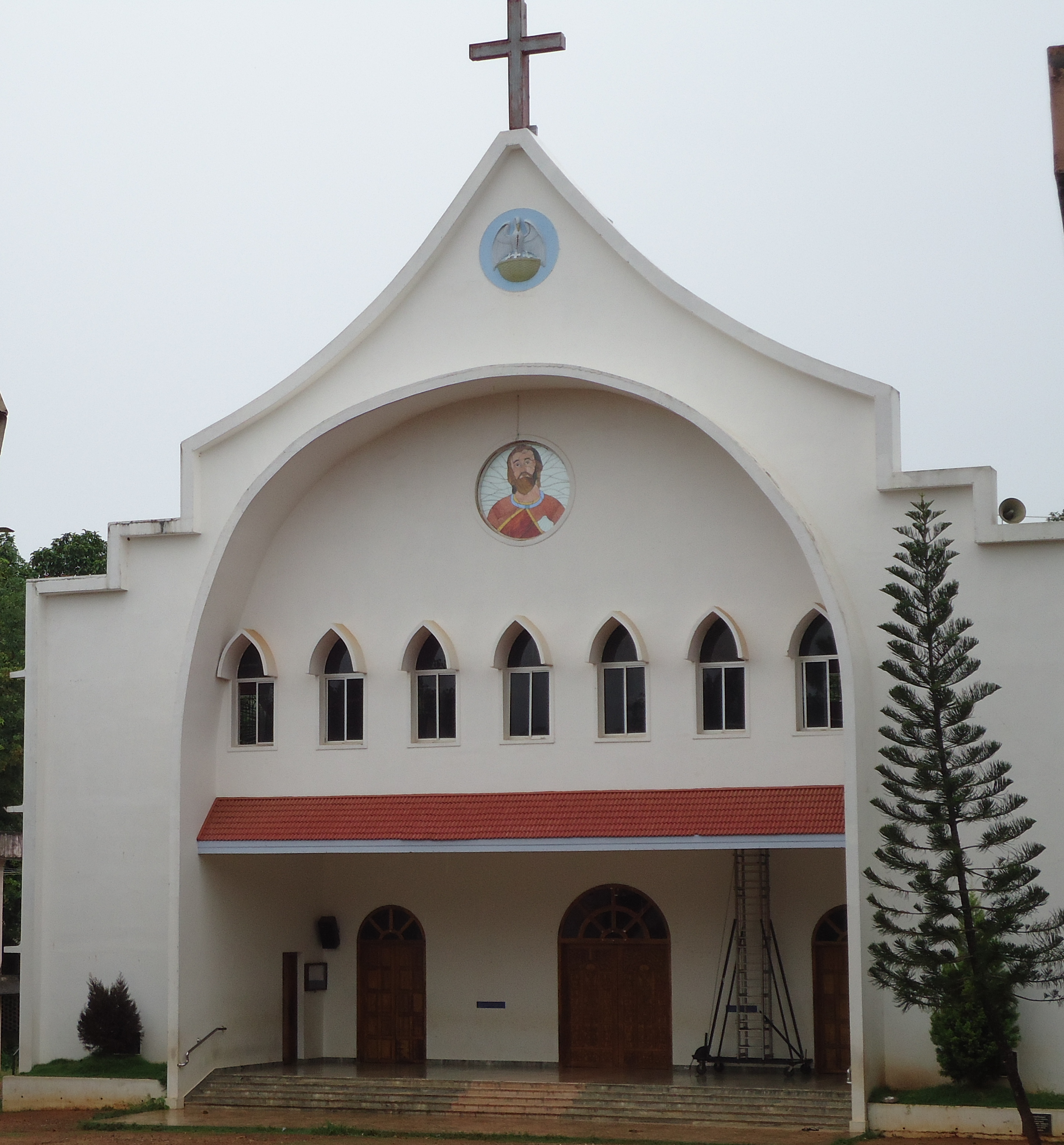
St James' Church, Puthenkadai (founded 1908)

Felix Wilfred was born in Puthenkadai, Kanyakumari district, Tamil Nadu, to B. Arogyam (a school headmaster) and Mary Josephine (a housewife). After schooling, Wilfred traveled to the Pontifical Urban University in Rome in 1965 to pursue philosophical and theological studies, in order to train for the priesthood. He then studied Italian literature at the University of Perugia and French philosophy and literature at the University of Caen.

After completing his studies, Wilfred returned to India in 1977 to teach at St. Paul's Major Seminary (Tamil Nadu). In 1993, he moved to the Department of Christian Studies, University of Madras, first as a Professor and then, in 2000, as Head of the Department.

He was shaped by the events around the Second Vatican Council and was a major advocate for contextual theology and Asian liberation theology.

He died in Chennai at the age of 76 on 7 January 2025. His funeral was held at St James' Church, Puthenkadai.

== Works ==
- Wilfred, Felix (2021). Religious Identities and the Global South: Porous Borders and Novel Paths. Springer Nature. ISBN 978-3-030-60738-8.
- Wilfred, Felix, ed. (2014). The Oxford Handbook of Christianity in Asia. Oxford University Press. ISBN 978-0-19-932906-9.
- Wilfred, Felix (2008). Margins: Site of Asian Theologies. ISPCK. ISBN 978-81-8458-031-0.
- Wilfred, Felix (2007). Dalit Empowerment. ISPCK. ISBN 978-81-7214-994-9.
- Wilfred, Felix (2002). On the Banks of Ganges: Doing Contextual Theology. ISPCK. ISBN 978-81-7214-645-0.
- Wilfred, Felix (2000). Asian Dreams and Christian Hope: At the Dawn of the Millennium. ISPCK. ISBN 978-81-7214-580-4.
- Wilfred, Felix (1993). Beyond Settled Foundations: The Journey of Indian Theology. Department of Christian Studies, University of Madras.
- Wilfred, Felix, ed. (1992). Leave the Temple: Indian Paths to Human Liberation. Orbis Books. ISBN 978-1-60899-206-5.
