= Poggio Mirteto Cathedral =

- Cathedral of Saint Mary Assumed
- Cattedrale di Santa Maria Assunta
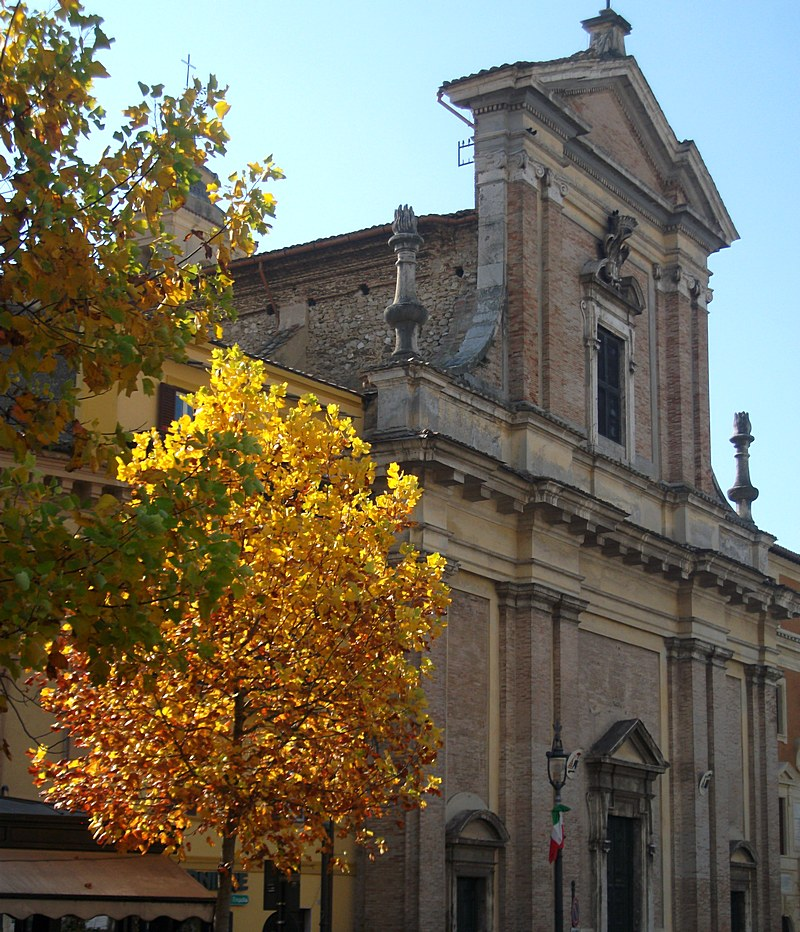
- View of facade

- Location within Lazio Location within Italy
- 42°15′52″N 12°41′03″E
- Location: Piazza Martiri della Libertà, Poggio Mirteto, Rieti
- Country: Italy
- Language: Italian
- Denomination: Catholic
- Tradition: Roman Rite
- Website: smassunta.it

History
- Status: Cathedral
- Founded: 1684
- Dedication: Assumption of Mary
- Consecrated: 3 October 1779

Architecture
- Functional status: Active
- Architect: Martino Longhi the Younger
- Architectural type: Italian Baroque
- Completed: 1721

Administration
- Diocese: Suburbicarian Diocese of Sabina–Poggio Mirteto

The Cattedrale di Santa Maria Assunta is the Catholic cathedral of the Suburbicarian Diocese of Sabina–Poggio Mirteto, located in the city of Poggio Mirteto, Italy.

== History ==
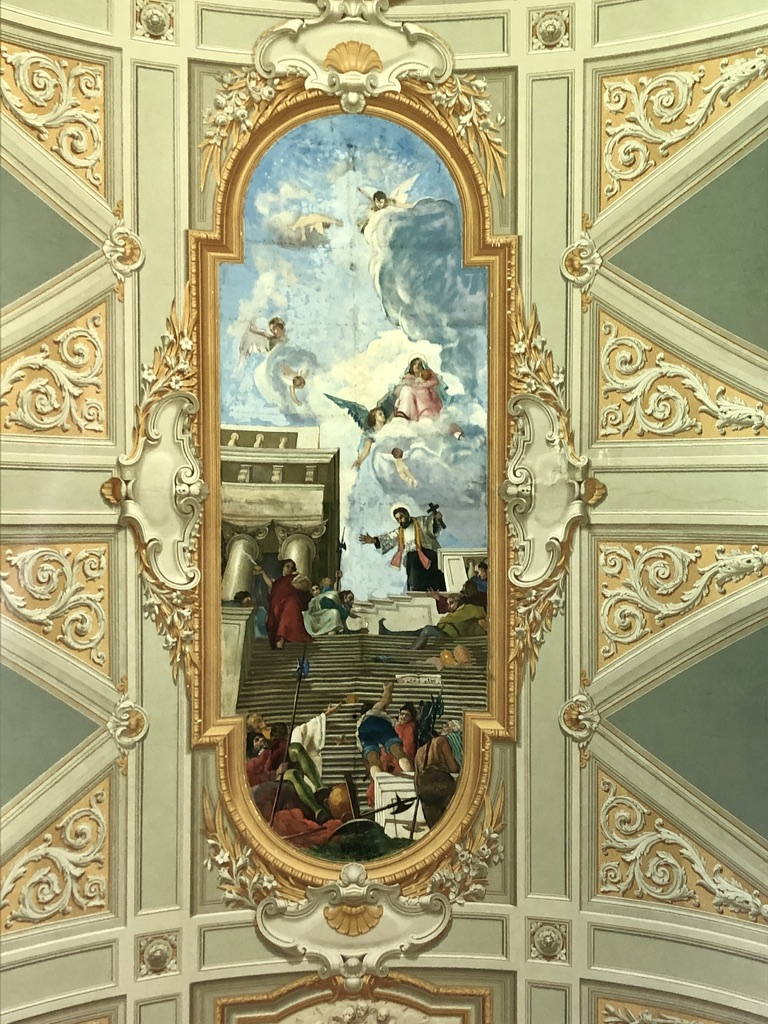
Ceiling fresco depicting Pope Saint Innocent I

The church of Santa Maria Assunta, dedicated to the Assumption of Mary, was blessed in 1684, began operation in 1721, and was consecrated on 3 October 1779 by Monsignor Contessini. The architect was Martino Longhi the Younger.

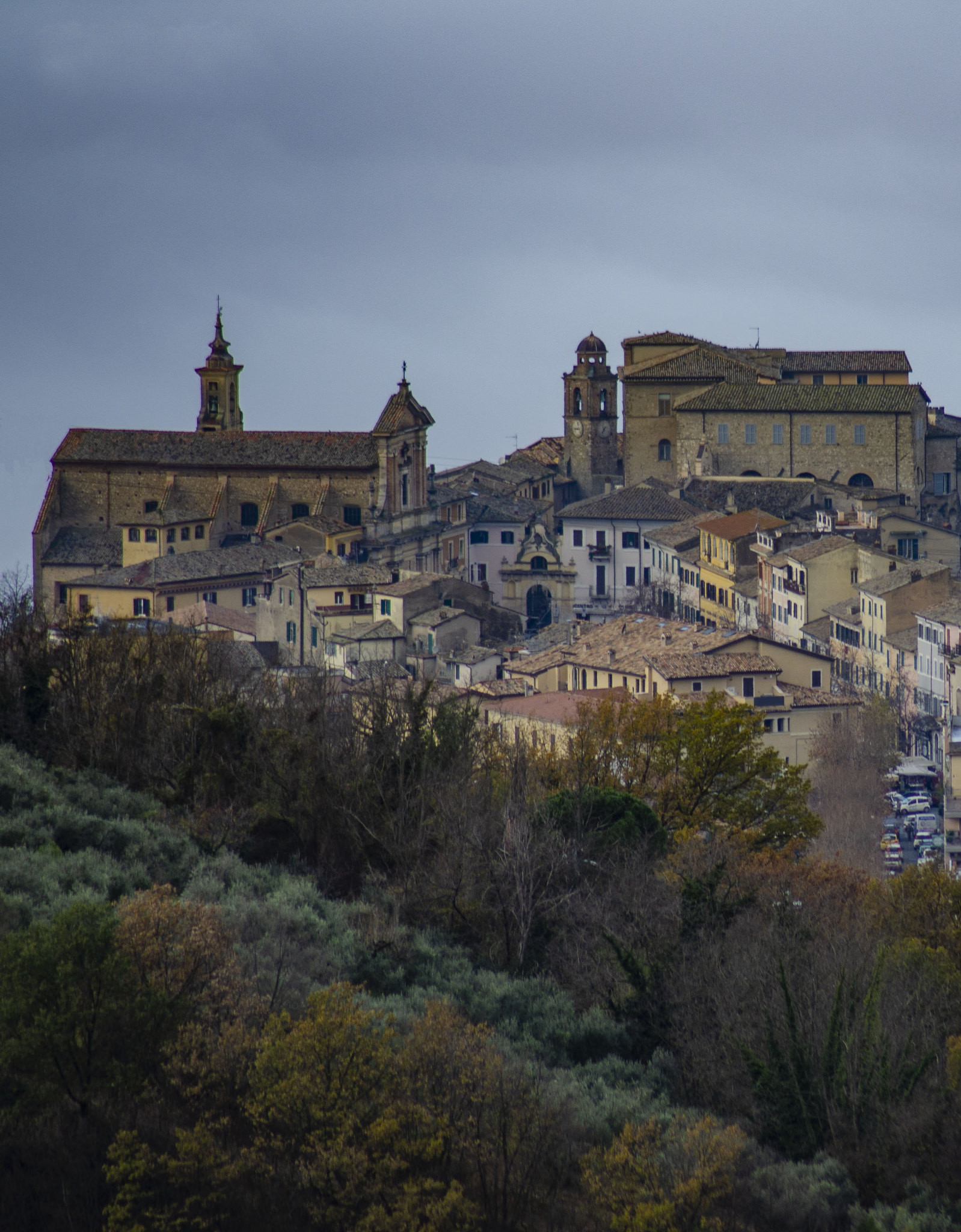
View of Poggio Mirteto, cathedral at left

In 1841, Poggio Mirteto was elevated to a diocese, and the parish church of Santa Maria Assunta became a cathedral. The first bishop was Nicola Crispigni, who made his solemn inauguration in 1842.

In 1925 the Diocese of Poggio Mirteto was united with the Suburbicarian Diocese of Sabina, with which it currently forms the Suburbicarian Diocese of Sabina–Poggio Mirteto. The cathedral of Poggio Mirteto became the see of the new suburbicarian diocese. The title is given to a cardinal, who has the high rank of cardinal-bishop. Suburbicarian dioceses are dioceses located within the ecclesiastical province of the Diocese of Rome. They are not titular churches, but serve a similar function as honorary assignments that signify the cardinals' relationship with the Pope.

Pope John Paul II visited in 1993.

Cardinal-protectors

- Gaetano de Lai (see above 1925–1928)
- Donato Sbarretti (1928–1939)
- Enrico Sibilia (1939–1948)
- Adeodato Giovanni Piazza (1949–1957)
- Marcello Mimmi (1958–1961)
- Giuseppe Ferretto (1961–1973)
- Antonio Samoré (1974–1983)
- Agnelo Rossi (1984–1995)
- Eduardo Francisco Pironio (1995–1998)
- Lucas Moreira Neves (1998–2002)
- Giovanni Battista Re (from 2002)
