= Torrita Tiberina =

- Comune
- Comune di Torrita Tiberina
- Location within Italy Location within Lazio
- Coordinates: 42°14′N 12°37′E
- Country: Italy
- Region: Lazio
- Metropolitan city: Rome (RM)

Area
  - Total: 10.8 km^{2} (4.2 sq mi)
- Elevation: 174 m (571 ft)

Population (Dec. 2004)
  - Total: 1,010
  - Density: 93.5/km^{2} (242/sq mi)
- Time zone: UTC+1 (CET)
  - Summer (DST): UTC+2 (CEST)
- Postal code: 00060
- Dialing code: 0765
- Website: Official website

Torrita Tiberina is a comune (municipality) in the Metropolitan City of Rome in the Italian region of Lazio, located about 40 kilometres (25 mi) north of Rome. As of 31 December 2004, it had a population of 1,010 and an area of 10.8 square kilometres (4.2 mi^{2}).

Torrita Tiberina borders the following municipalities: Filacciano, Montopoli di Sabina, Nazzano, Poggio Mirteto.

== Demographic evolution ==
Historical population

Year	Pop.	±%
1861	?	—
1871	479	—
1881	477	−0.4%
1901	697	+46.1%
1911	723	+3.7%

Year	Pop.	±%
1921	740	+2.4%
1931	751	+1.5%
1936	879	+17.0%
1951	1,139	+29.6%
1961	1,019	−10.5%

Year	Pop.	±%
1971	755	−25.9%
1981	709	−6.1%
1991	830	+17.1%
2001	932	+12.3%

Source: Data from ISTAT
