= Angelo Dolci =

Italian prelate

His Eminence Angelo Maria Dolci
- Archpriest for the Basilica di Santa Maria Maggiore
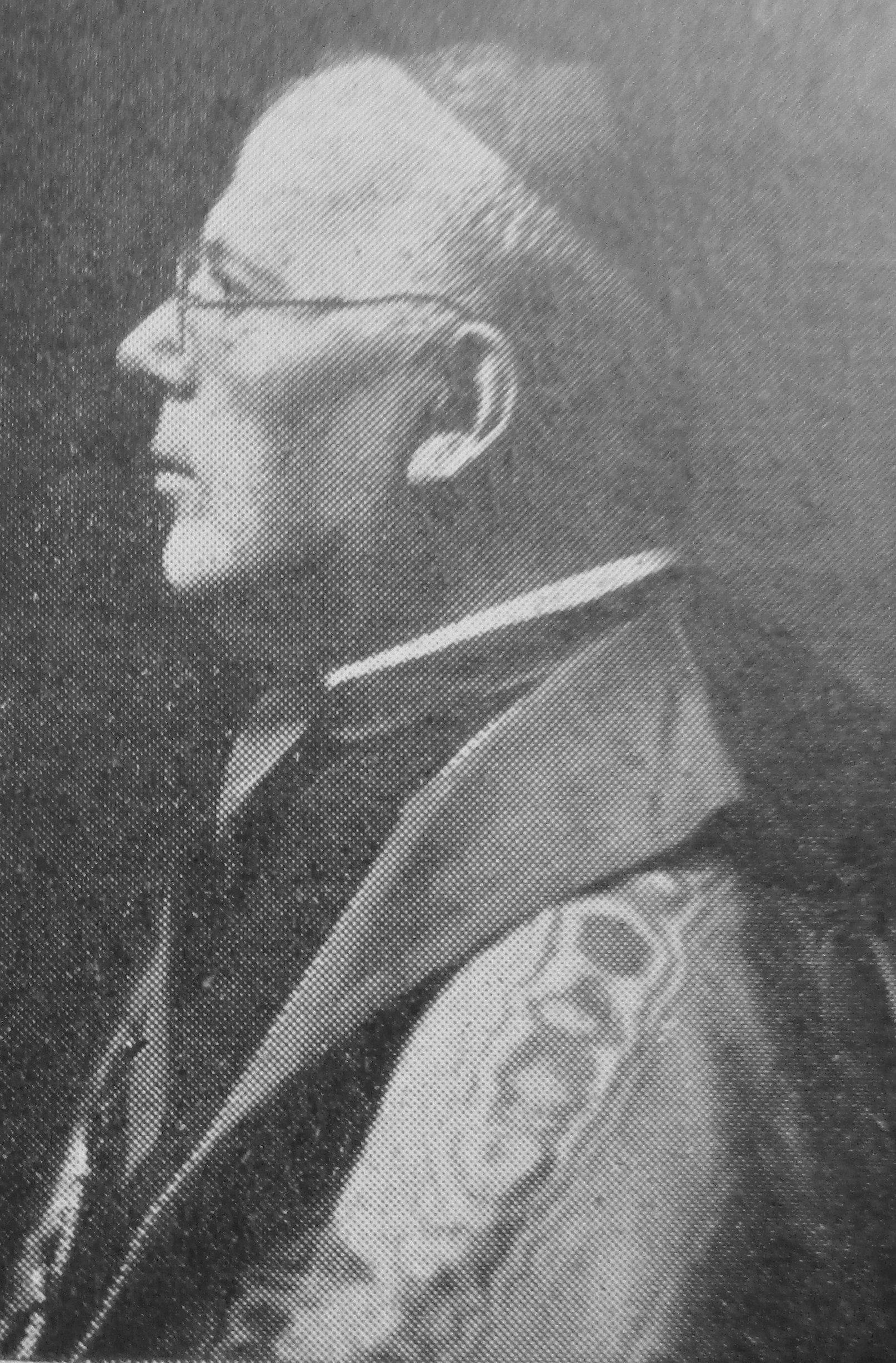
- Church: Roman Catholic Church
- Appointed: 22 May 1933
- Term ended: 13 September 1939
- Predecessor: Bonaventura Cerretti
- Successor: Alessandro Verde
- Other post: Cardinal-Bishop of Palestrina (1936–39)
- Previous posts: Bishop of Gubbio (1900–06); Apostolic Delegate to Ecuador (1906–10); Apostolic Delegate to Peru (1906–10); Apostolic Delegate to Bolivia (1906–10); Titular Archbishop of Nazianzus (1906–11); Archbishop of Amalfi (1911–14); Vicar Apostolic of Constantinople (1914–22); Apostolic Delegate to Constantinople (1914–22); Titular Archbishop of Hierapolis in Syria (1914–33); Apostolic Delegate to Persia (1918–21); Apostolic Nuncio to Romania (1923–33); Cardinal-Priest of Santa Maria della Vittoria (1933–36)

Orders
- Ordination: 5 June 1890
- Consecration: 13 May 1900 by Francesco di Paolo Satolli
- Created cardinal: 13 March 1933 by Pope Pius XI
- Rank: Cardinal-Priest (1933–36); Cardinal-Bishop (1936–39)

Personal details
- Born: Angelo Maria Dolci; 12 July 1867 Civitella di Agliano, Bagnoregio, Papal States
- Died: 13 September 1939 (aged 72) Civitella di Agliano, Bagnoregio, Kingdom of Italy
- Education: Pontifical Roman Athenaeum Saint Apollinare; Pontifical Academy of Ecclesiastical Nobles
- Coat of arms

Styles of Angelo Dolci
- Reference style: His Eminence
- Spoken style: Your Eminence
- Informal style: Cardinal
- See: Palestrina (Suburbicarian diocese)

Angelo Maria Dolci (12 July 1867 – 13 September 1939) was an Italian prelate of the Catholic Church who was made a cardinal in 1933. He was Bishop of Gubbio from 1900 to 1906, Archbishop of Amalfi from 1911 to 1914, and Apostolic Vicar of Constantinople from 1914 to 1922. He also served in the diplomatic corps of the Holy See as an Apostolic Delegate or Apostolic Nuncio from 1906 to 1910 and from 1914 to 1933.

== Biography ==
Dolci was born in Civitella d'Agliano on 12 July 1867 and was ordained a priest on 5 June 1890. In preparation for a career in the diplomatic service, he entered the Pontifical Ecclesiastical Academy in 1892.

Pope Leo XIII appointed him bishop of Gubbio on 19 April 1900. He was named apostolic delegate in Ecuador, Bolivia, and Peru on 7 December 1906. He was promoted to titular archbishop of Nazianzo on 9 December 1906. He was recalled to Rome in 1910.

He was appointed Archbishop of Amalfi on 27 January 1911. He was appointed Apostolic Delegate and vicar apostolic of Constantinople on 10 June 1914. His assignment to the titular archdiocese of Gerapoli followed on 16 November 1914.

On 14 December 1922, he was appointed as Apostolic Nuncio to Belgium, however, he could not take possession of the nunciature and was named Nuncio to Romania on 30 May 1923.

He was created Cardinal-Priest of Santa Maria della Vittoria, Rome by Pope Pius XI in the consistory of 13 March 1933. He was appointed Archpriest of the Basilica of Saint Mary Major on 22 May 1933. He was elected to the order of cardinal bishops, taking the suburbicarian see of Palestrina 15 June 1936. He participated in the conclave of 1939 that elected Pope Pius XII. He died in September of that year.

=== Armenian genocide ===
In 1915, as Apostolic Delegate to Constantinople (1914–1922), Archbishop Dolci wrote to Mehmed V and Talaat Pasha to ask for mercy on behalf of the Armenians, who were then being deported and massacred. Dolci reported back to the Vatican to Pope Benedict XV and his secretary of foreign affairs Eugenio Pacelli, the future Pope Pius XII. He admitted he had been deceived by the Turks, because despite giving contrary assurances to the Holy See delegate, they continued to massacre the Armenians.

He died at his home in Civitella d'Agliano on 13 September 1939.

Catholic Church titles
Preceded by Bonaventura Cerretti	Archpriest of the Basilica di Santa Maria Maggiore; 22 May 1933 – 13 September 1939	Succeeded by Alessandro Verde
Preceded by Luigi Sincero	Cardinal-Bishop of Palestrina; 15 June 1936 – 13 September 1939	Succeeded by Carlo Salotti
