= Mario Mocenni =

Italian Cardinal

His Eminence Mario Mocenni
- Cardinal-Bishop of Sabina
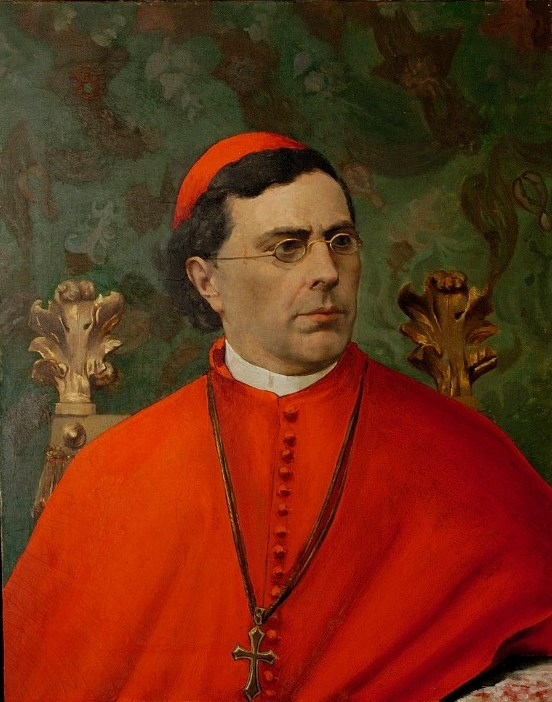
- Church: Roman Catholic Church
- Appointed: 18 May 1894
- Term ended: 14 November 1904
- Predecessor: Luigi Serafini
- Successor: Francesco di Paola Cassetta
- Previous posts: Titular Archbishop of Heliopolis (1877-93); Apostolic Delegate to Colombia (1877-82); Apostolic Delegate to Costa Rica (1877-82); Apostolic Delegate to Nicaragua (1877-82); Apostolic Delegate to Honduras (1877-82); Apostolic Delegate to Ecuador (1877-82); Apostolic Delegate to Peru (1877-82); Apostolic Delegate to Bolivia (1877-82); Apostolic Delegate to Venezuela (1877-82); Apostolic Internuncio to Brazil (1882); Cardinal-Priest of San Bartolomeo all'Isola (1893-94)

Orders
- Ordination: 20 December 1845
- Consecration: 12 August 1877 by Alessandro Franchi
- Created cardinal: 16 January 1893 by Pope Leo XIII
- Rank: Cardinal-Priest (1893-94); Cardinal-Bishop (1894-1904)

Personal details
- Born: Mario Mocenni; 22 January 1823 Montefiascone, Viterbo, Papal States
- Died: 14 November 1904 (aged 81) Apostolic Palace, Rome, Kingdom of Italy
- Buried: Campo Verano

Styles of Mario Mocenni
- Reference style: His Eminence
- Spoken style: Your Eminence
- Informal style: Cardinal
- See: Sabina (suburbicarian)

Mario Mocenni (22 January 1823 – 14 November 1904) was an Italian Cardinal of the Roman Catholic Church, who served both in the diplomatic service of the Holy See and in the Roman Curia, and was elevated to the cardinalate in 1893.

== Biography ==
Born in Montefiascone, Mario Mocenni was ordained to the subdiaconate on 21 September 1844, the diaconate on 27 May 1845 and the priesthood on 20 December 1845. He was later made a Privy Chamberlain supernumerary of His Holiness, and auditor of nunciature to Austria.

On 24 July 1877, he was appointed Titular Archbishop of Heliopolis in Phoenicia by Pope Pius IX, receiving his episcopal consecration on the following 12 August from Cardinal Alessandro Franchi in Rome. Mocenni was later named Apostolic Delegate to Ecuador, Peru, Nueva Granada, Venezuela, Guatemala, Costa Rica, Honduras, and Nicaragua on 14 August that year. On 28 March 1882, he became Internuncio to the Empire of Brazil.

Seven months later, on 18 October 1882, Mocenni entered the service of the Roman Curia upon being appointed Substitute, or deputy, of the Vatican Secretariat of State. Pope Leo XIII created him Cardinal Priest of San Bartolomeo all'Isola in the consistory of 16 January 1893. He later opted to become a Cardinal Bishop, assuming the suburbicarian see of Sabina on 18 May 1894. As Cardinal Bishop of Sabina, he was also perpetual abbot of Farfa. Mocenni participated in the papal conclave of 1903, which selected Pope Pius X.

Mocenni had a long history of supporting the Church in diplomacy and finances.

The Cardinal died in Rome, at age 81. After lying in state in the church of Santa Maria in Traspontina, he was buried in the chapel of the Sacred Congregation of Propaganda Fide in the Campo Verano cemetery.

== Books ==
- Jankowiak, François (2005), "La Curie romaine," in: Vincent Viaene (2005). Papacy and the New World Order: Vatican Diplomacy, Catholic Opinion and International Politics at the Time of Leo XIII, 1878-1903 (in French). Leuven University Press. p. 76. ISBN 978-90-5867-518-7.
- Lentz, Harris M. (2009). Popes and Cardinals of the 20th Century: A Biographical Dictionary. McFarland. p. 128. ISBN 978-1-4766-2155-5.
- Pollard, John F. (2005). Money and the Rise of the Modern Papacy: Financing the Vatican, 1850-1950. Cambridge University Press. pp. 68–69. ISBN 978-0-521-81204-7.
