= Montopoli =

Montopoli may refer to two Italian municipalities:

- Montopoli di Sabina, in the province of Rieti, Lazio
- Montopoli in Val d'Arno, in the province of Pisa, Tuscany
