= Alessandro Verde =

Italian Roman Catholic Cardinal

His Eminence Alessandro Verde
- Archpriest for the Basilica di Santa Maria Maggiore
- Church: Roman Catholic Church
- Appointed: 11 October 1939
- Term ended: 29 March 1958
- Predecessor: Angelo Maria Dolci
- Successor: Carlo Confalonieri
- Other posts: Cardinal-Priest of Santa Maria in Cosmedin pro hac vice (1935–1958); Protopriest (1952–1958)
- Previous posts: Secretary of the Congregation for Rites (1915–1925); Cardinal-Deacon of Santa Maria in Cosmedin (1925–1935)

Orders
- Ordination: 31 March 1888
- Created cardinal: 14 December 1925 by Pope Pius XI
- Rank: Cardinal-Deacon (1925–1935); Cardinal-Priest (1935–1958)

Personal details
- Born: Alessandro Verde; 27 March 1865 Sant'Antimo, Aversa, Kingdom of the Two Sicilies
- Died: 29 March 1958 (aged 93) Villa San Francisco, Rome, Italy
- Education: Pontifical Roman Athenaeum Saint Apollinare
- Coat of arms

Styles of Alessandro Verde
- Reference style: His Eminence
- Spoken style: Your Eminence
- Informal style: Cardinal
- See: none

Alessandro Verde (27 March 1865 – 29 March 1958) was an Italian Roman Catholic Cardinal and Archpriest of the Basilica di Santa Maria Maggiore.

== Early life ==
He was born in Sant'Antimo, and educated at the Seminary of Aversa, where he was ordained. Later, he continued his studies at the Pontifical Roman Seminary of "S. Apollinare", where he received doctorates in theology in 1890 and a doctorate utroque iuris (in both canon and civil law) 1893.

He worked in the Roman Curia after his studies and worked in the Diocese of Rome. He served as a professor of civil law at the Pontifical Roman Athenaeum "S. Apollinare" from 1896 until 1897. He was created Privy chamberlain of His Holiness on 1897. He worked as an assessor of the Congregation for the Evangelization of Peoples from 1897. He was elevated to the level of Domestic prelate of His Holiness on 16 January 1902. He was appointed Secretary of the Congregation for the Causes of Saints on 26 June 1915.

== Cardinal ==
He was created Cardinal-Deacon of S. Maria in Cosmedin in the consistory of 14 December 1925 by Pope Pius XI. He opted for the order of cardinal priests and his deaconry was elevated pro hac vice in 1935. He participated in the conclave of 1939 that elected Pope Pius XII. He was appointed Archpriest of the Basilica di Santa Maria Maggiore. When Verde died, he was both the oldest living cardinal and the Cardinal protoprete as the longest-serving member of the college (which is actually a relatively rare occurrence).

He died in 1958 two days after his 93rd birthday and is buried in his family's tomb in Sant'Antimo.

== Sources ==
- Cardinals of the Holy Roman Church

Catholic Church titles
Preceded by Angelo Dolci	Archpriest of the Basilica di Santa Maria Maggiore; 11 October 1939 – 29 March 1958	Succeeded by Carlo Confalonieri
Records
Preceded by Enrico Sibilia	Oldest living cardinal 4 August 1948 – 29 March 1958	Succeeded by José María Caro Rodríguez
