= Poggio Mirteto =

Municipality in Latium, Italy

- Comune
- Comune di Poggio Mirteto
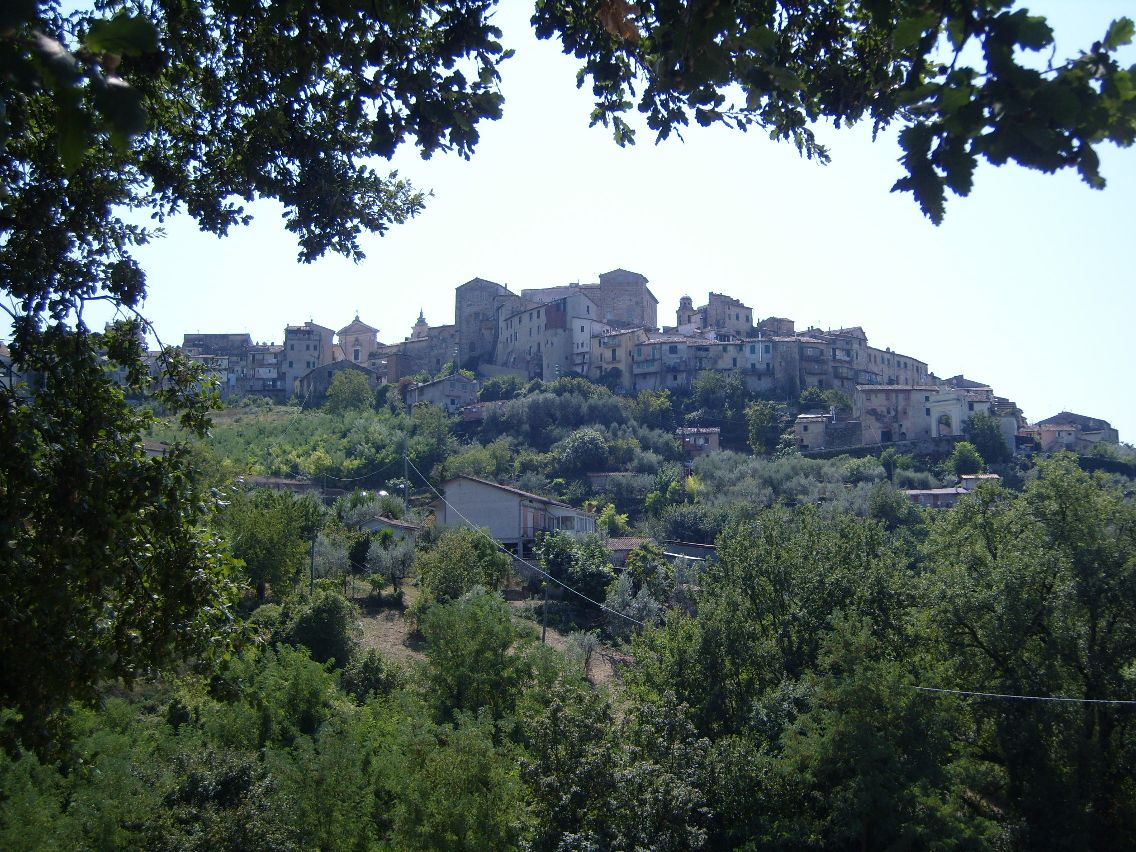
- View of Poggio Mirteto

- Coat of arms

- Location within Italy Location within Lazio
- Coordinates: 42°16′N 12°41′E
- Country: Italy
- Region: Lazio
- Province: Rieti (RI)

Government
  - Mayor: Giancarlo Micarelli

Area
  - Total: 26.4 km^{2} (10.2 sq mi)
- Elevation: 246 m (807 ft)

Population (30 November 2016)
  - Total: 6,359
  - Density: 241/km^{2} (624/sq mi)
- Demonym: Poggiani
- Time zone: UTC+1 (CET)
  - Summer (DST): UTC+2 (CEST)
- Postal code: 02047
- Dialing code: 0765
- Patron saint: Saint Cajetan
- Saint day: 7 August
- Website: Official website

Poggio Mirteto is a comune (municipality) is situated in the Tiber Valley area of the region of Latium, Italy. Administratively Poggio Mirteto is in the province of Rieti (formerly part of the province of Perugia) and geographically this municipality is about 45 kilometres (28 mi) northeast of Rome and about 20 kilometres (12 mi) southwest of Rieti.

According to Giuseppe Marocco's 1833 book the name Poggio Mirteto means the "knoll with plenty of Myrtus plants" because in its territory there would be plenty of Myrtus plants (called mirto in Italian, which is where the adjective mirteto comes from) and the old town was built on a knoll which in Italian is translated with the toponym Poggio.

Poggio Mirteto Cathedral, formerly seat of its own bishops, became the episcopal see of the Bishop of the Suburbicarian Diocese of Sabina-Poggio Mirteto.

== History ==
A Roman villa called "Bagni di Lucilla" is nearby in the suburb of San Valentino. A famous mosaic discovered there can be seen in the Vatican Museums in Rome.

Poggio Mirteto was founded in the early 13th century in an area around some earlier small castles: previously in this area there had been some old Roman villas. Later the town became part of Papal States.

On 6 and 7 July 1849 Giuseppe Garibaldi, during his retreat from Rome with about 4,000 troops and his wife Anita, stopped in Poggio Mirteto: in Poggio Mirteto's main square there is a commemorative plaque in the building where Anita, who was pregnant, stayed during these days.

In the end of the year 1860, similarly to other Papal States territories, Poggio Mirteto joined the Kingdom of Sardinia during the fast events which arranged the making of the Kingdom of Italy that happened in the next year. The then Special Commissioner for the Province of Umbria of the Kingdom of Sardinia, Gioacchino Napoleone Pepoli, created by decree the Province of Umbria on 15 December 1860, merging the previous Districts of Perugia, Spoleto, Orvieto, Foligno, Terni and the one of Rieti; therefore Poggio Mirteto, which was in the Rieti District, was included in this new Province.

Since 27 January 1927, Poggio Mirteto has been part of the Province of Rieti which was established in the same year by Decree.

During World War II, Poggio Mirteto has been theatre of some episodes of the fight against the German occupation by the Partisans, on Monte Tancia, the Monte Tancia massacre took place, during the Nazi-fascist roundup. Afterwards, the Nazi bombings against civilian populations, in the square of Poggio Mirteto, during the Nazi retreat.

== Geography ==
The city center is situated on a hill, which is around 250 meters above the sea level, by the left bank of the river Tevere in a fertile region, where pot-herbs, cereals, grapes and pastures are cultivated. Olive plantation is the most typical product of the Poggio Mirteto's agriculture and its extra virgin olive oil has the Protected Designation of Origin (PDO) like all the extra virgin olive oil produced in Sabina.

The municipality of Poggio Mirteto, other than the city center, comprises the following hamlets (subdivisions, mainly villages), in Italian "frazioni":

- Poggio Mirteto Scalo
- San Valentino
- San Luigi
- La Misericordia
- Castel San Pietro

The biggest hamlet is Poggio Mirteto Scalo which has grown around the railway station, this hamlet is far from the city center around six kilometres, while Castel San Pietro is an enclave because its territory is not connected with the other territory of the municipality.

Poggio Mirteto borders one another the following municipalities: Poggio Catino, Montopoli di Sabina, Torrita Tiberina, Cantalupo in Sabina and Salisano.

The Farfa Abbey is in the municipality of Fara Sabina, border with Montopoli near Poggio Mirteto.

== Transportation ==
Poggio Mirteto is directly linked with Rome, Fiumicino Aeroporto railway station, Orte and other Lazio's towns through the railway FR1. The railway station is far from the city center around six kilometres.

The main road in the municipality territory it is the road SS 79 "Ternana" which is part of the connection between Terni to Rieti.

== Main sights ==
Piazza Martiri della Libertà is a square which represents the city center of Poggio Mirteto where there are the City Hall and the Poggio Mirteto Cathedral. This very large square, which is enclosed by buildings for the biggest part of its perimeter, was developed as an expansion of the old medieval city during the sixteenth and seventeenth centuries: the square is linked to the medieval part of the city through a monumental gateway, Porta Farnese: this gateway is named by the House of Farnese because its construction was proposed by the Cardinal Alessandro Farnese during the sixteen century when he was Abbot of Farfa. Opposite to Porta Farnese, at the other end of the square, there is the church of San Rocco (Saint Roch) which is up a staircase. In the centre of the square there is a garden with the war memorial.

The medieval part of the city, its first nucleus, conserves the huge bishop palace, a notable medieval clock tower, and the premises of the former prison.

In the municipality territory there are the following churches:

- Poggio Mirteto Cathedral
- San Giovanni
- San Rocco
- Sacra Famiglia
- San Paolo
- Madonna della Misericordia
- Santa Maria della Pietà

An old chimney made of bricks, now near the city center, is the most notable remainder of the former glassmaker Fajella which was built in the nineteenth century. In the municipality territory ancient ruins of Roman villas are numerous such as the villa called "Bagni di Lucilla" and a villa which traditionally is claimed to have been of Terentius Varro. In the countryside there are also remnants of small Roman aqueducts.

In the hamlet of Castel San Pietro there is an old castle.

According to the archeologist Antonio Nibby in 1801 in Poggio Mirteto was discovered a mosaic with Diana which now is in the Vatican Museum: this mosaic is described in a book of the archeologist Bartolomeo Nogara.

== Culture ==
The Carnival season in Poggio Mirteto comprises three landmarks events, all happening mainly in Piazza Martiri della Libertà:

- the first event is the festival of bruschetta on the penultimate Sunday of Carnival.
- the second one is the Carnival of the children on the Carnival Thursday.
- third one, on the first Sunday of the Lent, is the Carnevalone Liberato ('freed big Carnival' in Italian), a busker style festival with a parade of satirical groups and chariots.

In August, during the celebration of its patron saint, Saint Cajetan, Poggio Mirteto has some festivals.

== People ==
- Pietro Bonfante
- Raimondo D'Inzeo

The castle of Castel San Pietro was the subject of a painting made by the Flemish painter Paul Bril in the early seventeen century. Now this painting is in the museum which is in Palazzo Barberini in Rome.

== Twin towns ==
Poggio Mirteto is twinned with:

- Canéjan in 2003

== Gallery ==
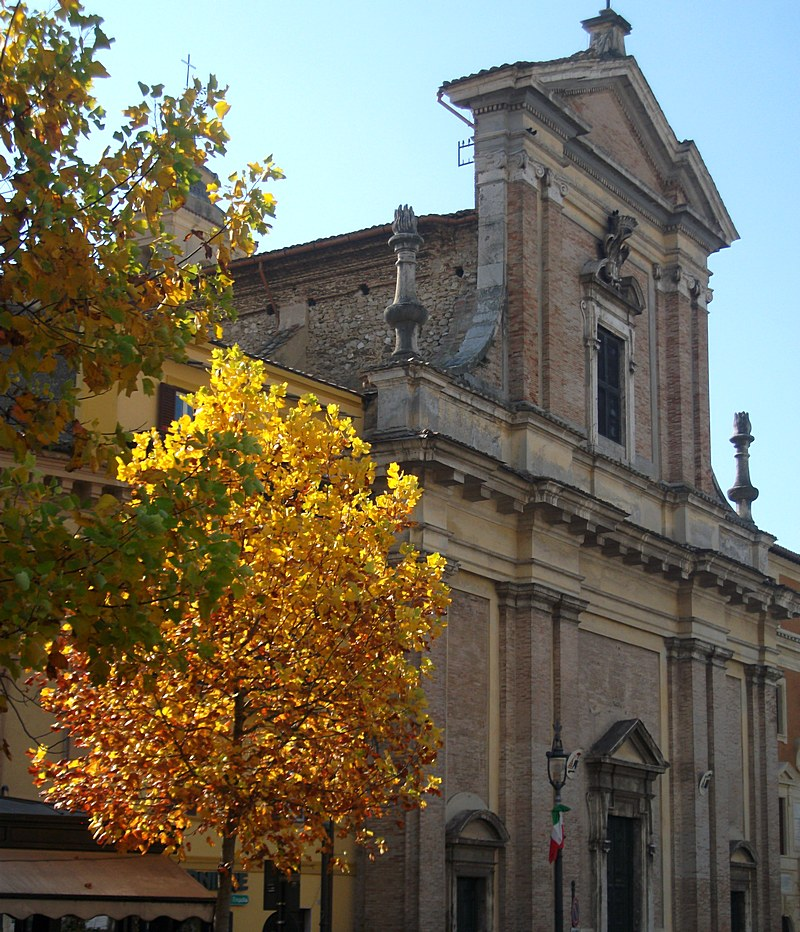
Poggio Mirteto Cathedral

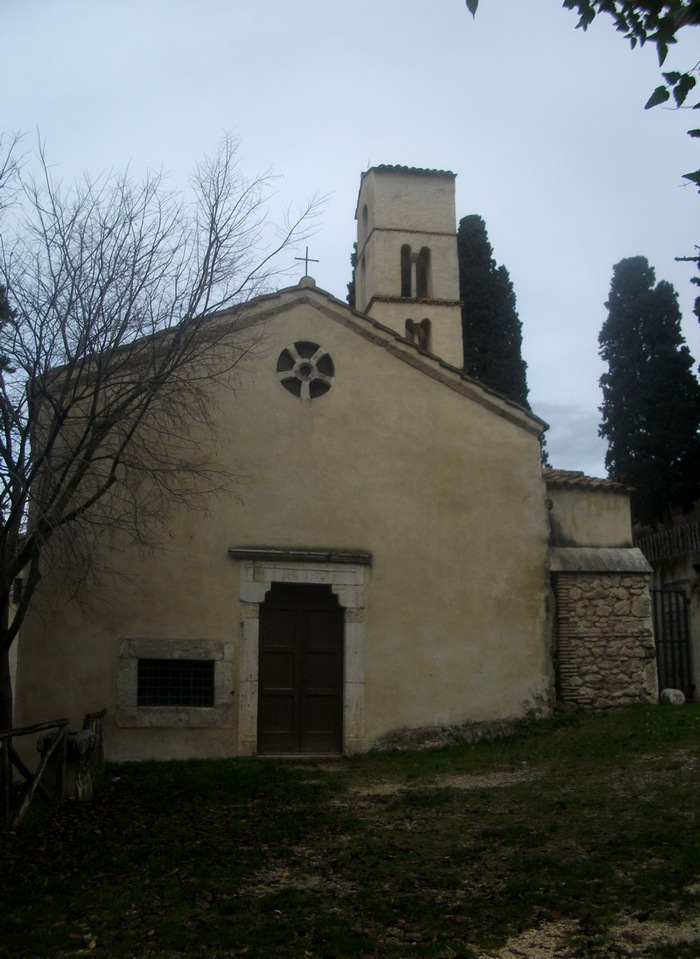
Saint Paul Church

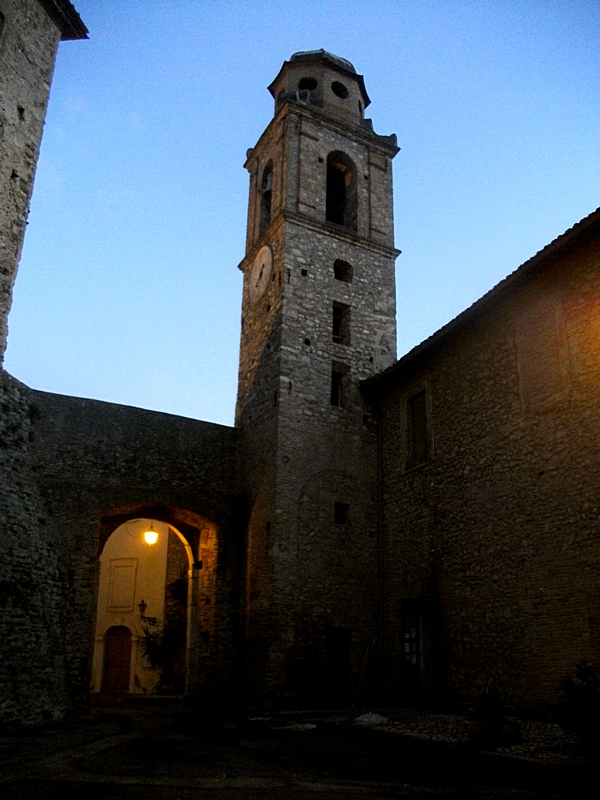
Clock tower

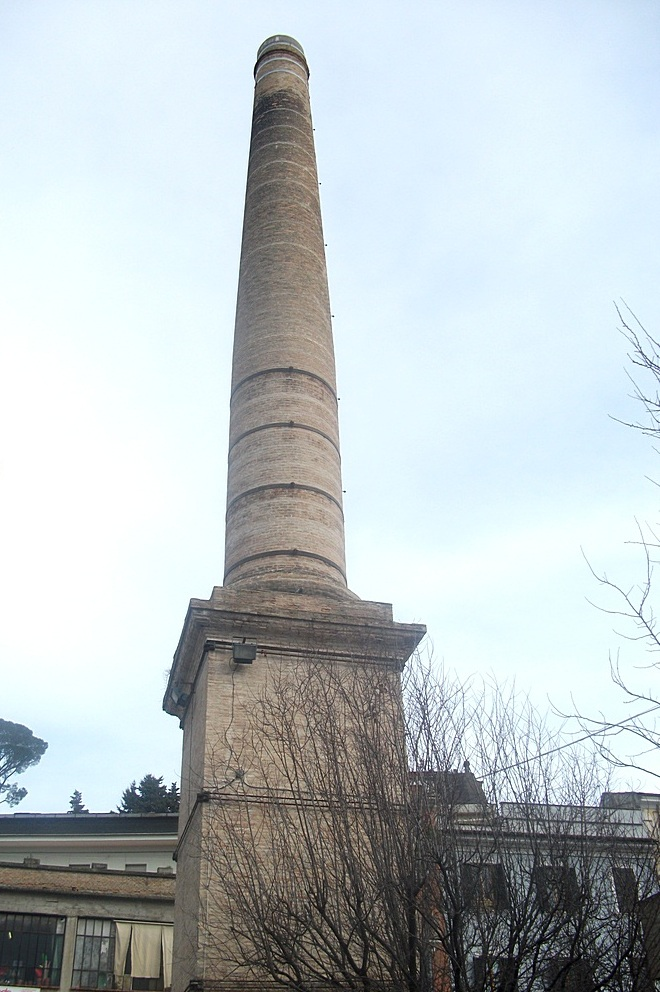
Former glassmaker's chimney

== See also ==
- Roman Catholic Diocese of Poggio Mirteto
