= Modern Automata Museum =

Museum in Italy

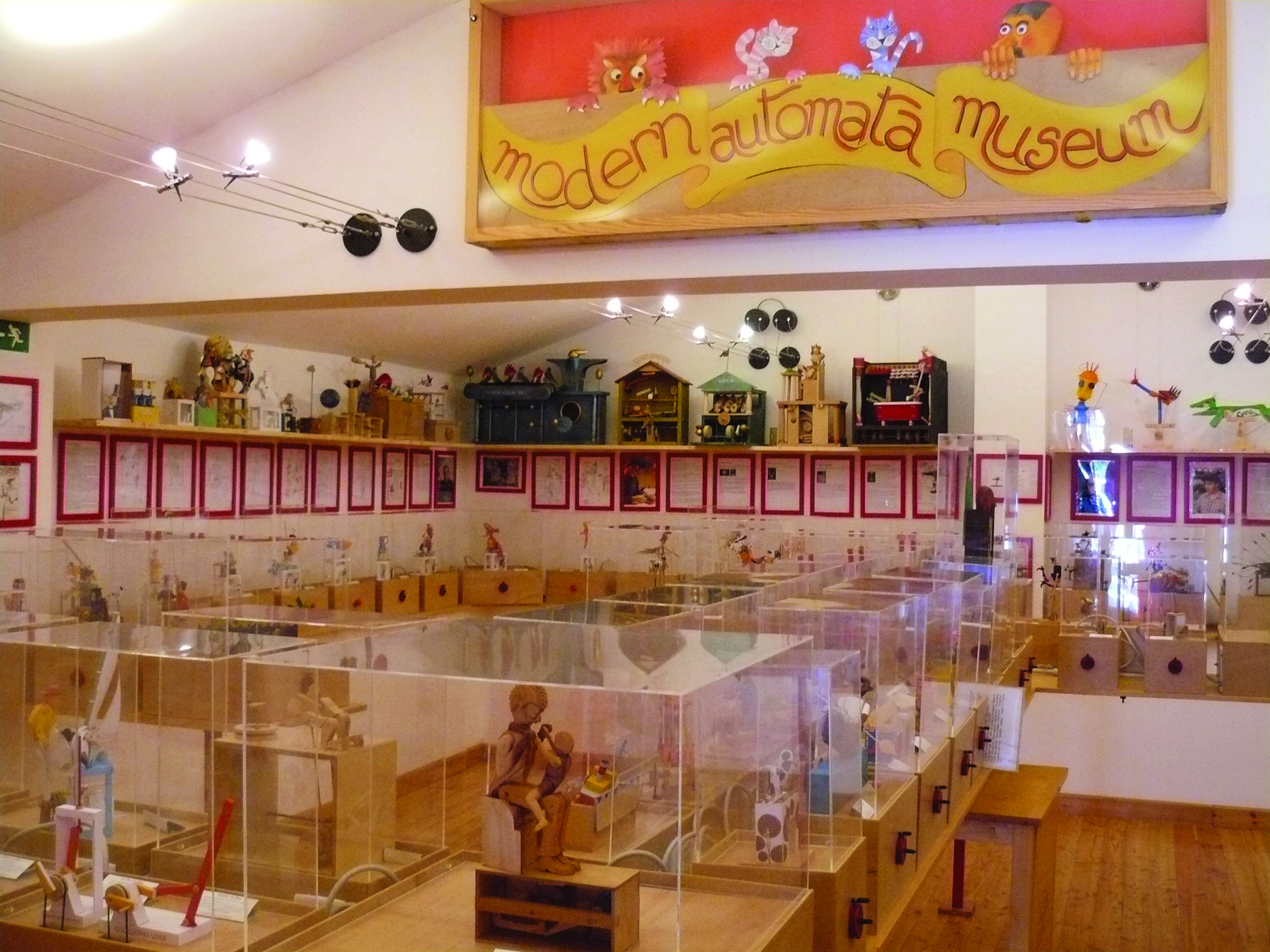
The Modern Automata Museum - Montopoli di Sabina - Rieti - Italy

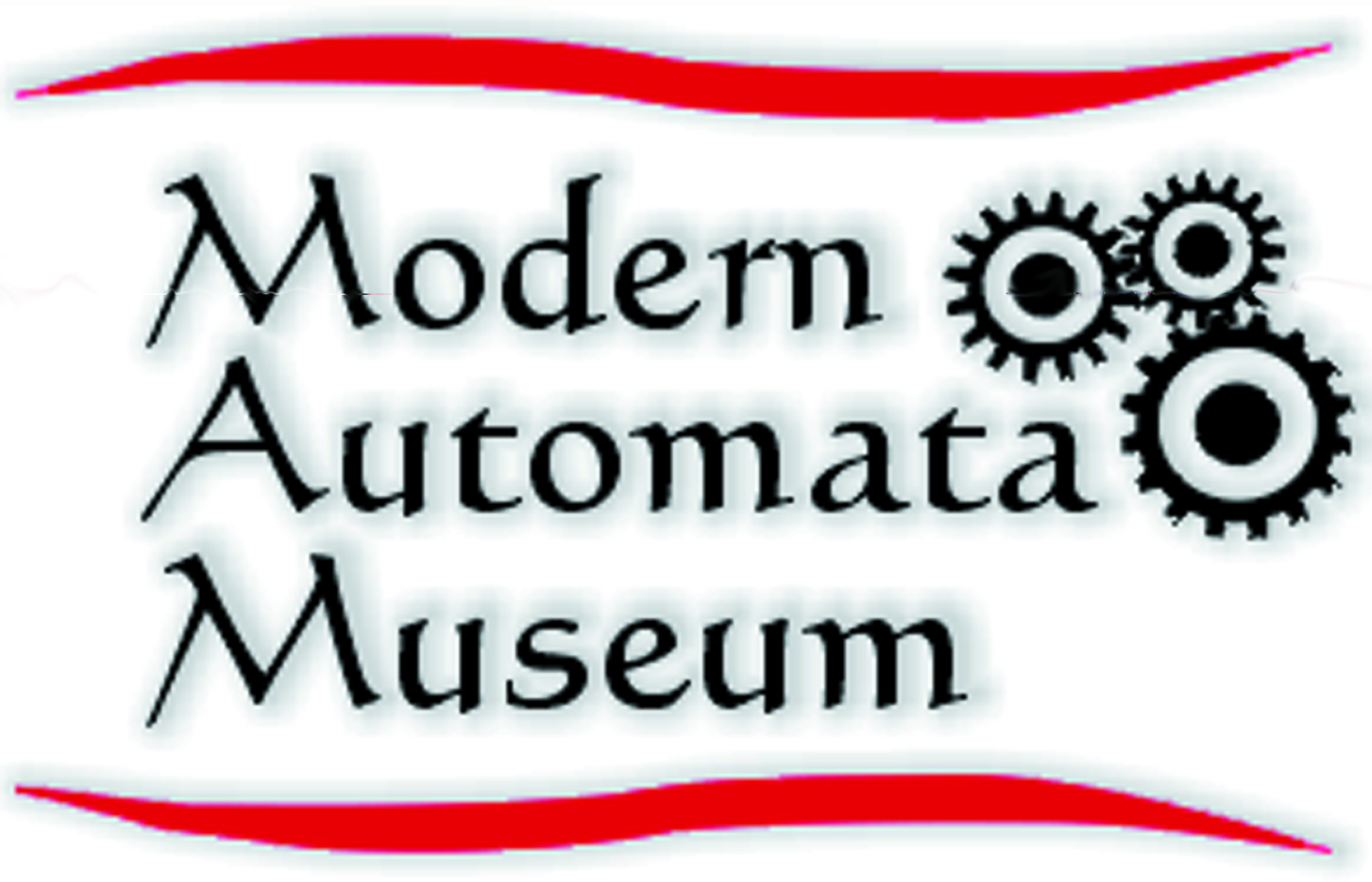
MAM logo

The Modern Automata Museum is a private museum of Montopoli di Sabina in the Province of Rieti, Italy, dedicated to modern automata, founded in 2001, entered in the Lazio Regional Museum organisation and listed as one of the "places of culture" from the Italian Ministry of Cultural Heritage and Activities.

The museum is located at the Castelletto di Vezzano (ninth century), a fortified outpost of Farfa Abbey.

The primary objective of the museum is to convey literary, scientific and artistic knowledge to primary and secondary schools students, through workshops for the construction of automata.

The Museum director is Guido Accascina.

== Museum collection ==
The automata are small mechanical sculptures, made of paper, wood and metal, which are set in motion by the visitors of the museum. They have been compared to Japanese Haiku and have been called by Lindoro Pazzotti "a small view of the world in a turn of the handle."

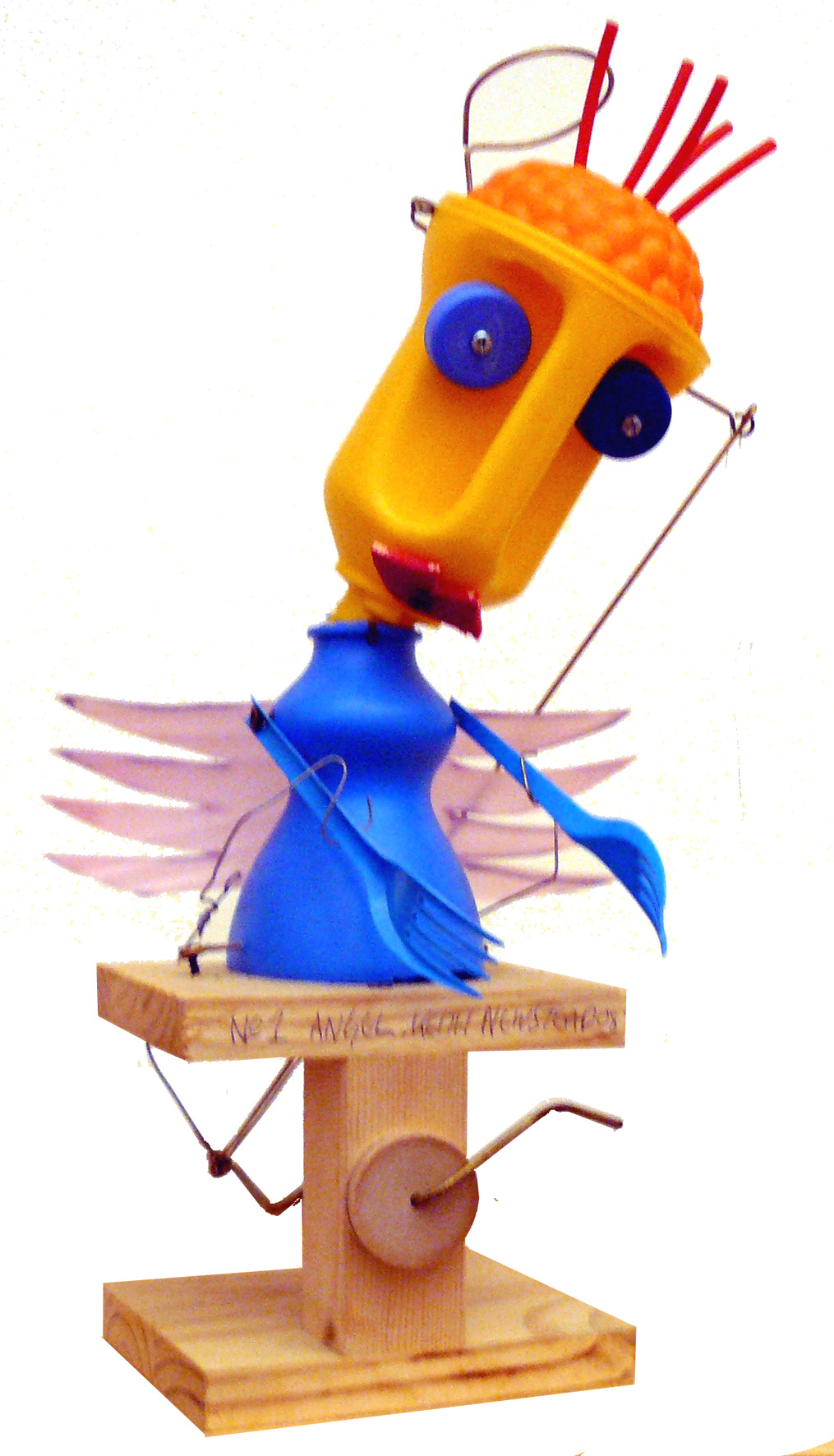
Angel by Keith Newstead - Mantova 2010

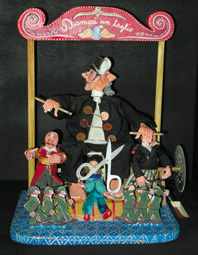
Diamoci un taglio by Girovago e Rondella, 2001

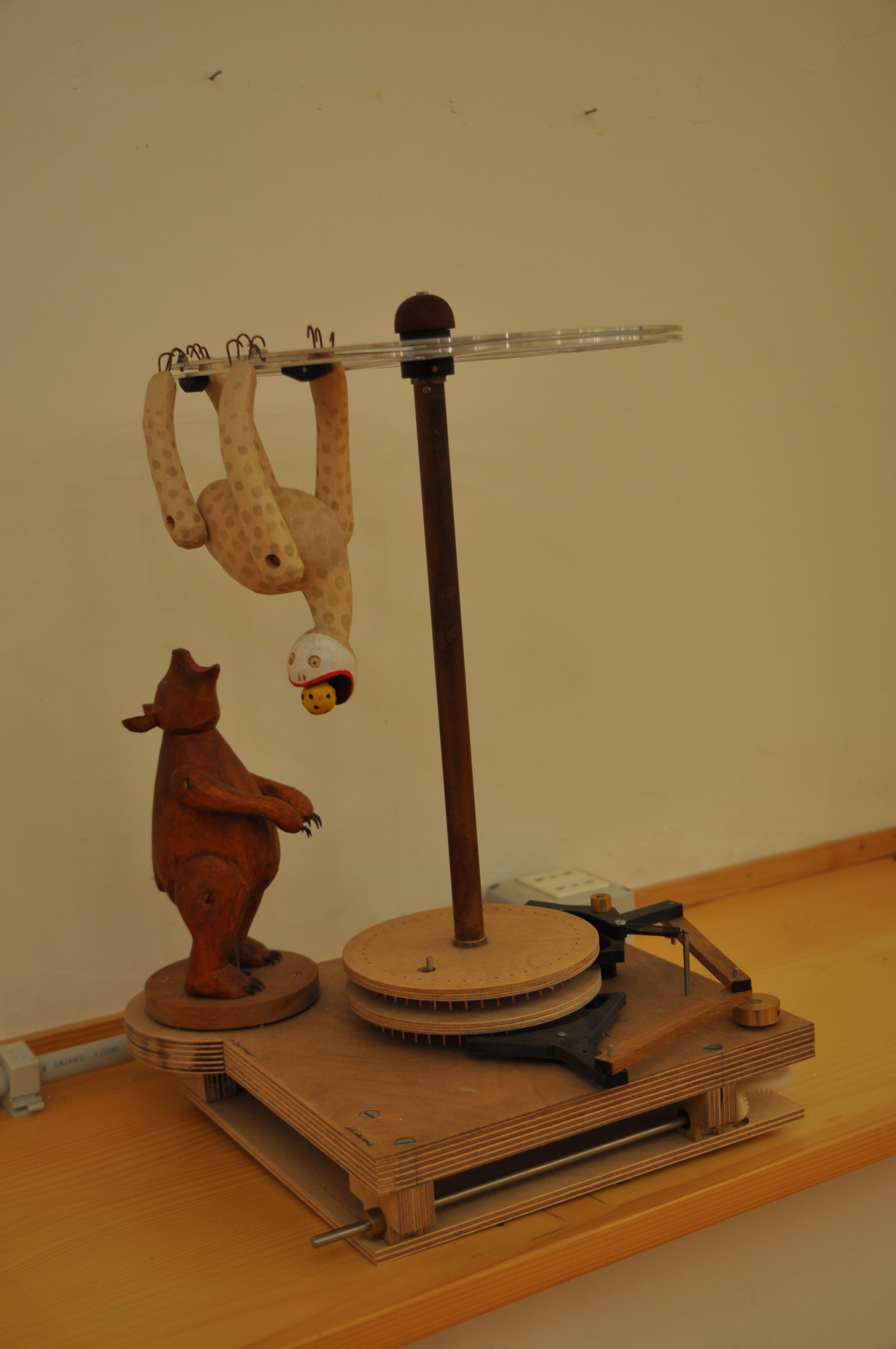
Circus bear & plantigrade by Paul Spooner, 2010

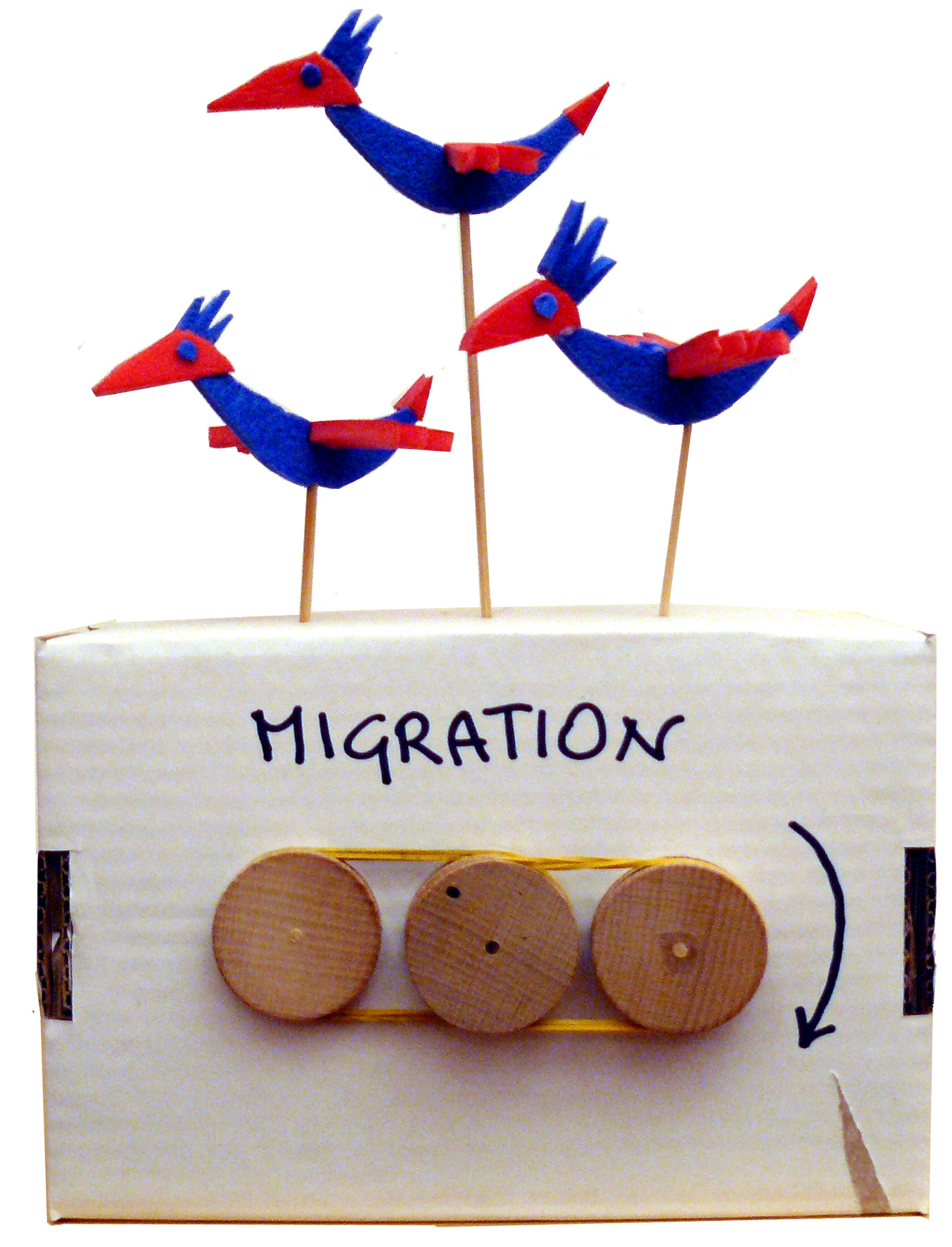
Birds migration by Guido Accascina (Basic Box), 2010

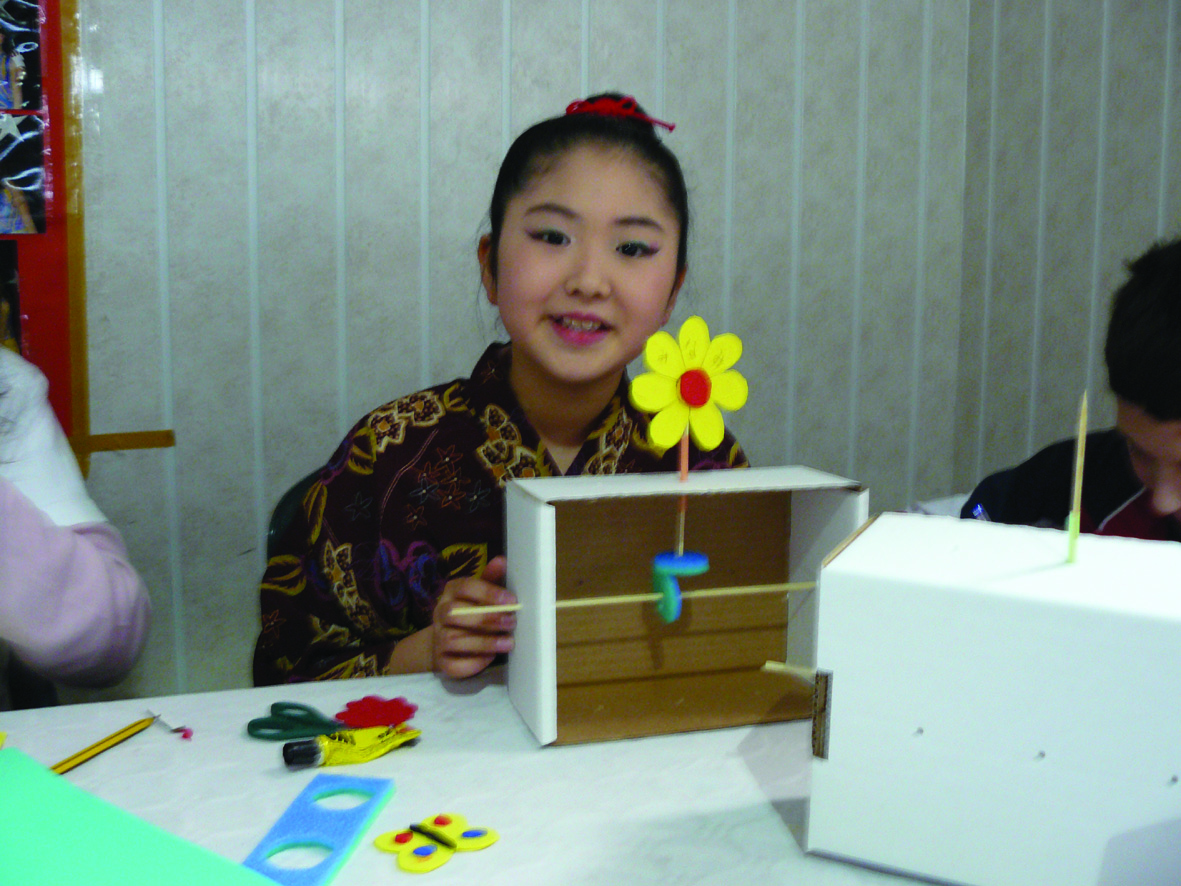
School workshop in Casperia - Rieti, 2009

The permanent collection consists of approximately 300 automata, made by Japanese, American, German, British, French, Canadian, South American and Italian artists.

- United Kingdom: Peter Markey, Paul Spooner, Keith Newstead, Neil Hardy, Eric Williamson, Rob Ives, Susie Stolpe, Cabaret Mechanical Theatre, Andy Hazell, Peter Lennertz
- Germany: Walter Ruffler, Malcolm Brook
- Japan: Keisuke Saka, Aquio Nishida
- United States of America: Marc Horowitz, Juta and Jim McCord
- Canada: Brian Gravestock
- Columbia: Carlos Zapata
- Italy: Rennie Orsi, Girovago e Rondella, Luca De Pascalis, Ivan Fodaro, Marina Gigli, Alessandra Celletti, Sonia Fabbrocino, Guido Accascina

== Works ==
Among the main works, the museum houses "Turkish Soup" by Paul Spooner, Keith Newstead seven works made during a workshop held at the Mantua Literature Festival in 2010, sixteen original works by various artists created for the exhibition "Against the idea of war" and twelve original works of various artists made for the exhibition Circus (2013). Many of the works are an example of the use of recycled materials for the construction of automata.

== Activities ==
The museum exhibits his works in the permanent headquarters of Montopoli di Sabina, and has created a series of traveling exhibitions that are exposed to other Museums: A Museum in motion (2002), against the idea of war (2003), Circus (2013). The museum is also a place of experimentation, cataloging, archiving, documentation and dissemination.

== Teaching ==
The Museum has organized workshops for the construction of automata at other museums, at Italian and European schools and playrooms at the pediatric wards of some hospitals. The laboratories are educationally based on involvement in the process of building multidisciplinary expertise in the field of humanities, science and art, and the teaching of "seven basic mechanical notes", through the combination of which it is possible to realize complex mechanical movements. On the basis of these principles has been developed a teaching methodology and a box for the construction of automata from recycled materials at low cost.

== Exhibitions and workshops ==
2002 - "Discovering the secrets of movement" - from March 26 to April 22, 2002 - Explora Children's Museum - Rome - Italy (with workshop)

2002 - "Small sculptures in motion" - from November 8 to December 8, 2002 - Gallery Artealcontrario - Modena - Italy (with workshop)

2003 - "Against the idea of war" - February 21, 2003 - Explora Children's Museum - Rome - Italy

2003 - "Against the idea of war" - from March 15 to ' April 8, 2003 - Schloss Neuemburg - Germany

2003 - "Automata at Magliano Museum" - From December 22, 2002 to January 6, 2003 - Museo Archeologico di Magliano Sabino - Rome - Italy (with workshop)

2005 - "Modern Automata Museum" - from April 7 to May 4, 2005 - Puppet Museum : Int.al A. Pasqualino - Palermo - Italy

2005 - "Dragons and knights from the fortress of Monaco to the hills of Montopoli" - June 9, 2005 - Convent of Santa Maria - Montopoli di Sabina - Rieti - Italy

2007 - "Against the idea of war" 23 to 25 November 2007 - Abbey of Farfa - Rieti - Italy

2007 - "The secret of the movement" - from 21 December 2007 to 13 January 2008 - Public Palace of Siena - Show on Governance - Siena - Italy

2007 - "Against the idea of war" 22 to 30 September 2007 - Public Palace of Siena - View : Peace on the walls - Siena - Italy

2008 - "The secret of the movement" - 3 to 7 September 2008-12th Festival of Literature - Palazzo della Ragione - Mantova - Italy (con workshop)

2010 - "The secret of the movement" - 12 to 17 January 2010 - Playroom Hospital of the Infant Jesus - Rome - Italy (with workshop)

2010 - "The secret of the movement" - from 7 March to 14 March 2010 - Game De Lellis Hospital - Rieti - Italy (with workshop)

2010 - "The secret of the movement" - from July 1 to September 15, 2011 - Porto Azzurro - Elba Island - Livorno - Italy

2010 - "The secret of the movement" - 9 to 14 November 2010 - Playroom Hospital of the Infant Jesus - Palidoro - Rome - Italy (with workshop)

2011 - "The secret of the movement" - from July 1 to September 15, 2011 - Porto Azzurro - Elba Island - Livorno - Italy

2012 - "Modern Automata Museum" - March 3, 2012 - Feast of the half Lazio Museums - Montopoli di Sabina - Rieti - Italy

2012 - "The secret of the movement" - from July 1 to August 30, 2012 - Porto Azzurro - Elba Island - Livorno - Italy

2012 - "Bremen workshop" - 15 to 17 October 2012 - School at Halmerweeg - Bremen - Germany

2013 - "The secret of the movement" - from February 16 to March 24, 2013 - Macro Museum - Testaccio - Department of Cultural policies of the Municipality of Rome - Rome - Italy ( with workshop )

2013 - "Circus" from April 7 to 21, 2013 - Sala Santa Rita - Department of Cultural policies of the Municipality of Rome - Rome - Italy

2013 - "Automata in Val di Fiemme": 1 to July 4, 2013 - Pala Fiemme - Cavalese - Trento - Italy (with workshop )

2013 - "Istanbul workshop" - October 23, 2013 - Montessori School Istanbul - Istanbul - Turkey

== Acknowledgments ==
2010: Lazio Region acknowledgment for the "good management"

2012: Lazio Region acknowledgment for the "good practices"

== Media ==
2005 - Rai 3 - Geo & Geo

2006 - Rai 3 - Sereno variabile

2007 - Rai 3 - Cominciamo bene

2013 - Repubblica TV - Circus

== Bibliography on automata ==
- Walter Ruffler, Paper Automata Mechanisms, Tarquin Publications, England, 2003,ISBN 1899618589
- Adrian Lawrence Onn & Gary Alexander, Cabaret Mechanical Movement, CMT, London, 1998, ISBN 0952872900
- AA.VV., Gli automi sono tra noi, Medusa Edizioni, Milano, 2011, ISBN 9788876982309
- Mario G. Losano, Automi d'Oriente, Medusa Edizioni, Milano, 2003, ISBN 8888130780
- Gaby Wood, Edison's eve, Anchor Books, New york, 2002, ISBN 1400031583
- Luca Garai, Gli automi di Leonardo, Bononia U.P., Bologna, 2007, ISBN 9788873952787
- Rodney Frost, Creative Kinetcs, Sterling, London, 2006, ISBN 9781402732232
- Rodney Peppe, Toys and models, Antique Collectors Club, Woodbridge, 2003, ISBN 1851494359
