= Montopoli di Sabina =

- Comune
- Comune di Montopoli di Sabina
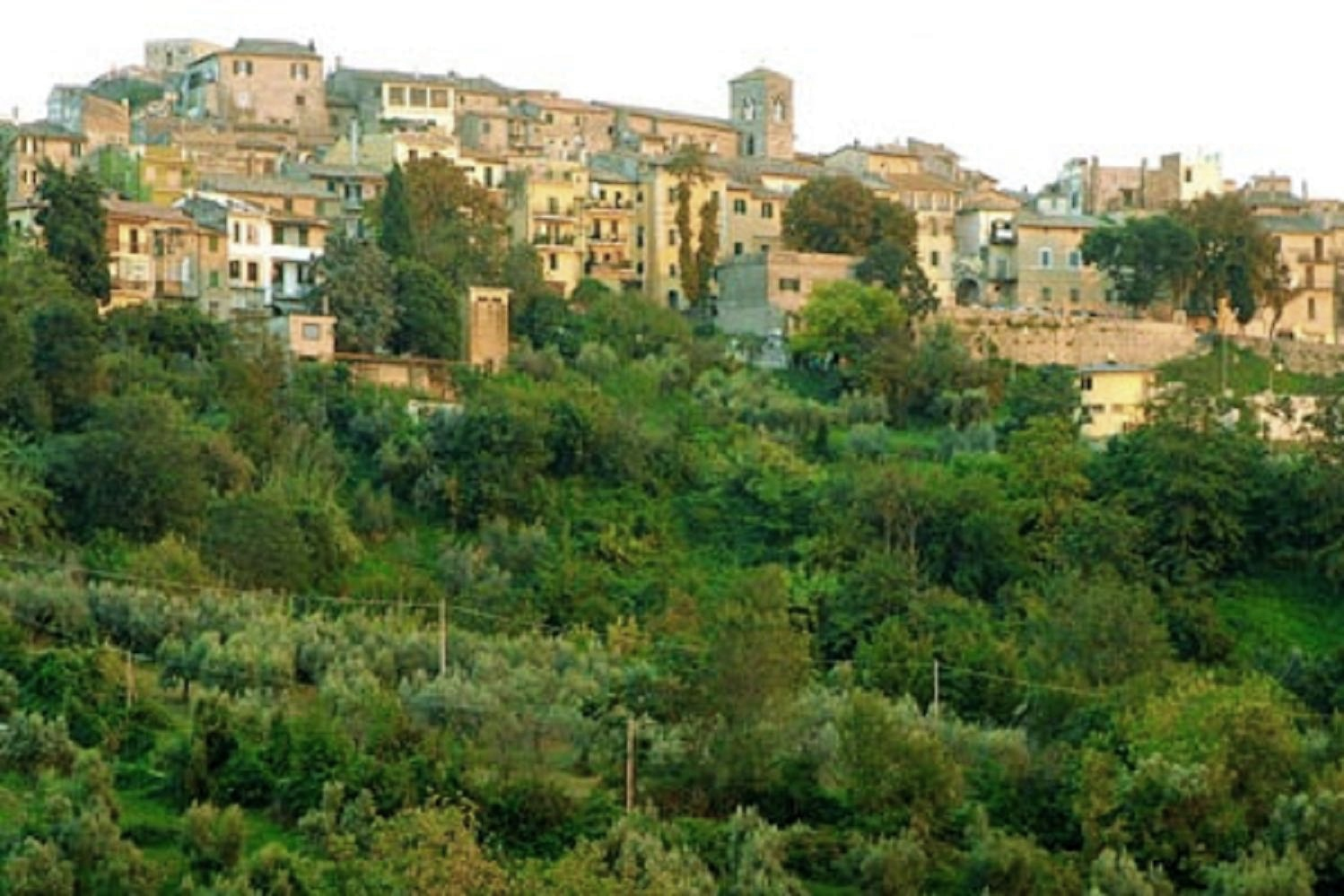
- View of Montopoli di Sabina

- Coat of arms

- Montopoli within the Province of Rieti

- Location within Italy Location within Lazio
- Coordinates: 42°14′45″N 12°41′30″E
- Country: Italy
- Region: Lazio
- Province: Rieti (RI)
- Frazioni: Bocchignano, Casenove, Colonnetta La Memoria, Ferruti, Granari, Granica, Ponte Sfondato, Ponticchio, Santa Maria

Government
  - Mayor: Andrea Fiori

Area
  - Total: 37.6 km^{2} (14.5 sq mi)
- Elevation: 331 m (1,086 ft)

Population (2011)
  - Total: 4,222
  - Density: 112/km^{2} (291/sq mi)
- Demonym: Montopolesi
- Time zone: UTC+1 (CET)
  - Summer (DST): UTC+2 (CEST)
- Postal code: 02034
- Dialing code: 0765
- Patron saint: St. Michael Archangel
- Saint day: September 29
- Website: Official website

Montopoli di Sabina is a town and comune (municipality) in the Province of Rieti in the Italian region of Latium, located about 40 kilometres (25 mi) northeast of Rome and about 20 kilometres (12 mi) southwest of Rieti. In 2011, it had a population of 4,222.

== History ==
The town was first mentioned in 1055, in a document of Farfa Abbey. It is locally known as The Town of Privateers (Italian: Il paese dei Corsari).

== Geography ==
Montopoli, located in the southwestern corner of the province, at the borders with the one of Rome, borders with the municipalities of Castelnuovo di Farfa, Fara in Sabina, Fiano Romano (RM), Nazzano (RM), Poggio Mirteto, Salisano and Torrita Tiberina (RM). Its southwestern borders with Fiano are crossed by the Tiber river.

Montopoli counts the hamlets (frazioni) of Bocchignano, Casenove, Colonnetta La Memoria, Ferruti, Granari, Granica, Ponte Sfondato, Ponticchio and Santa Maria.

== Main sights ==
- The Modern Automata Museum, founded in 2001, is located in the town
- The cyclopean masonry of Grotte di Torri is located nearby the village of Ponte Sfondato

== Gallery ==
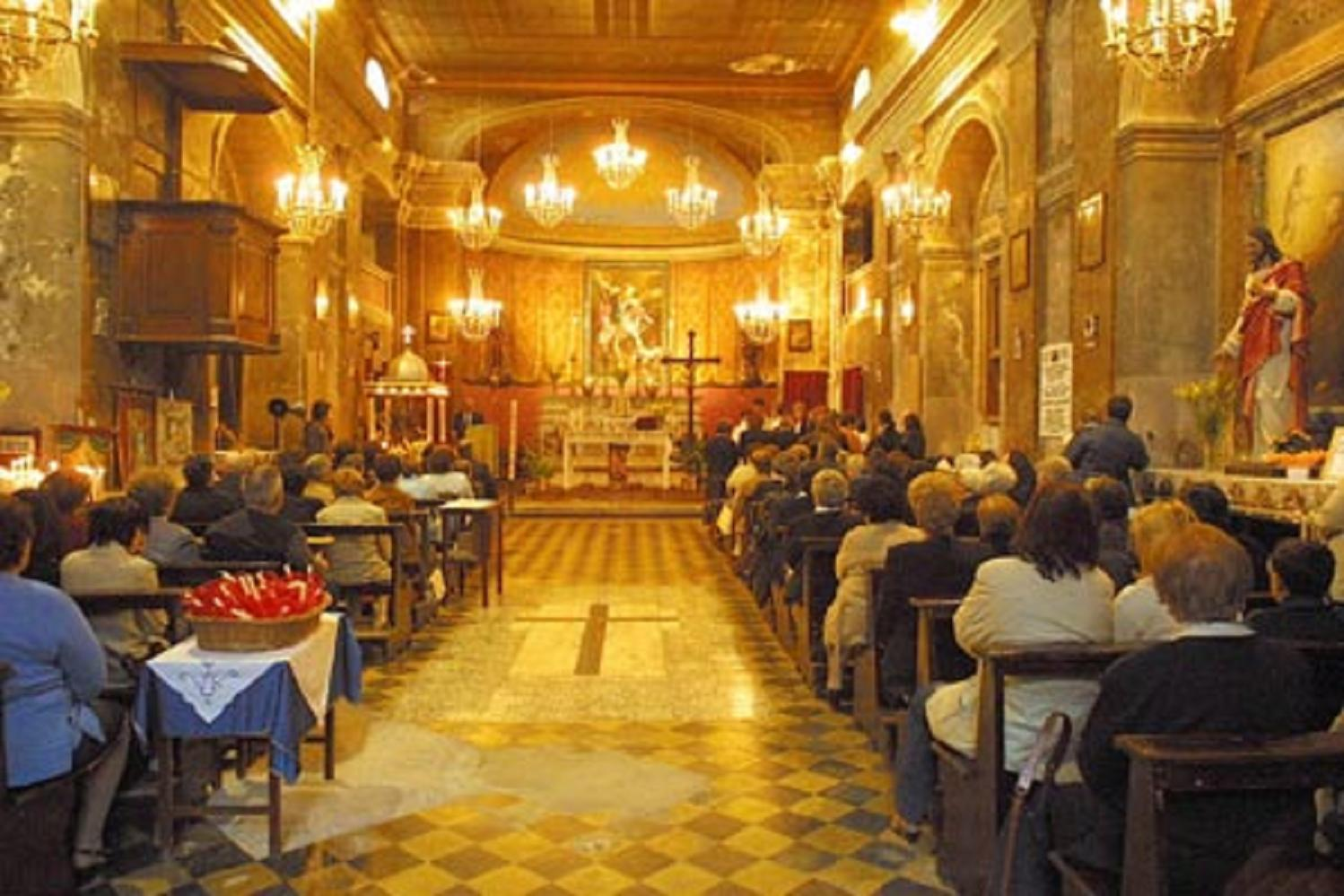
Interior of St. Michael's Church

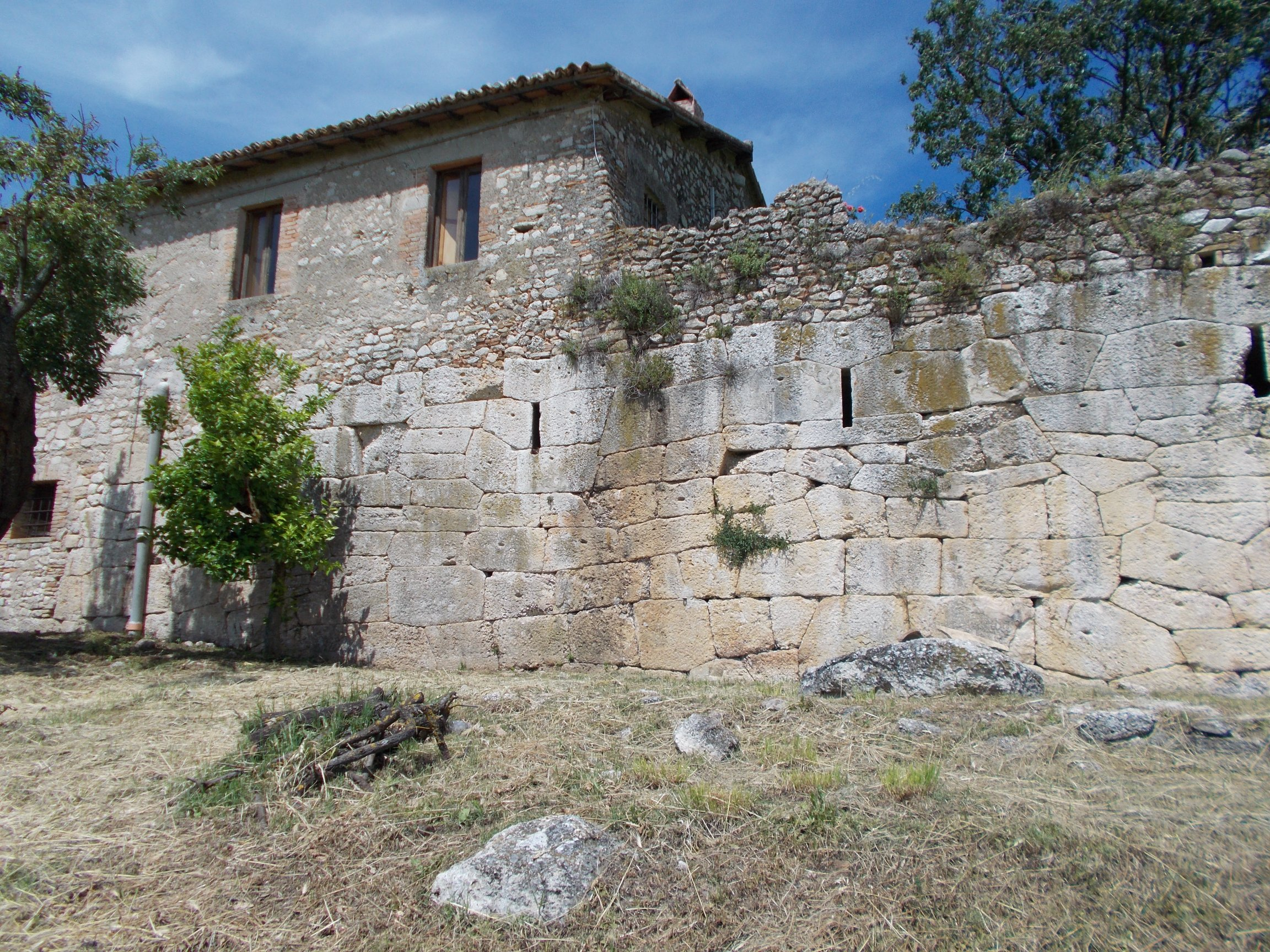
The cyclopean masonry of Grotte di Torri

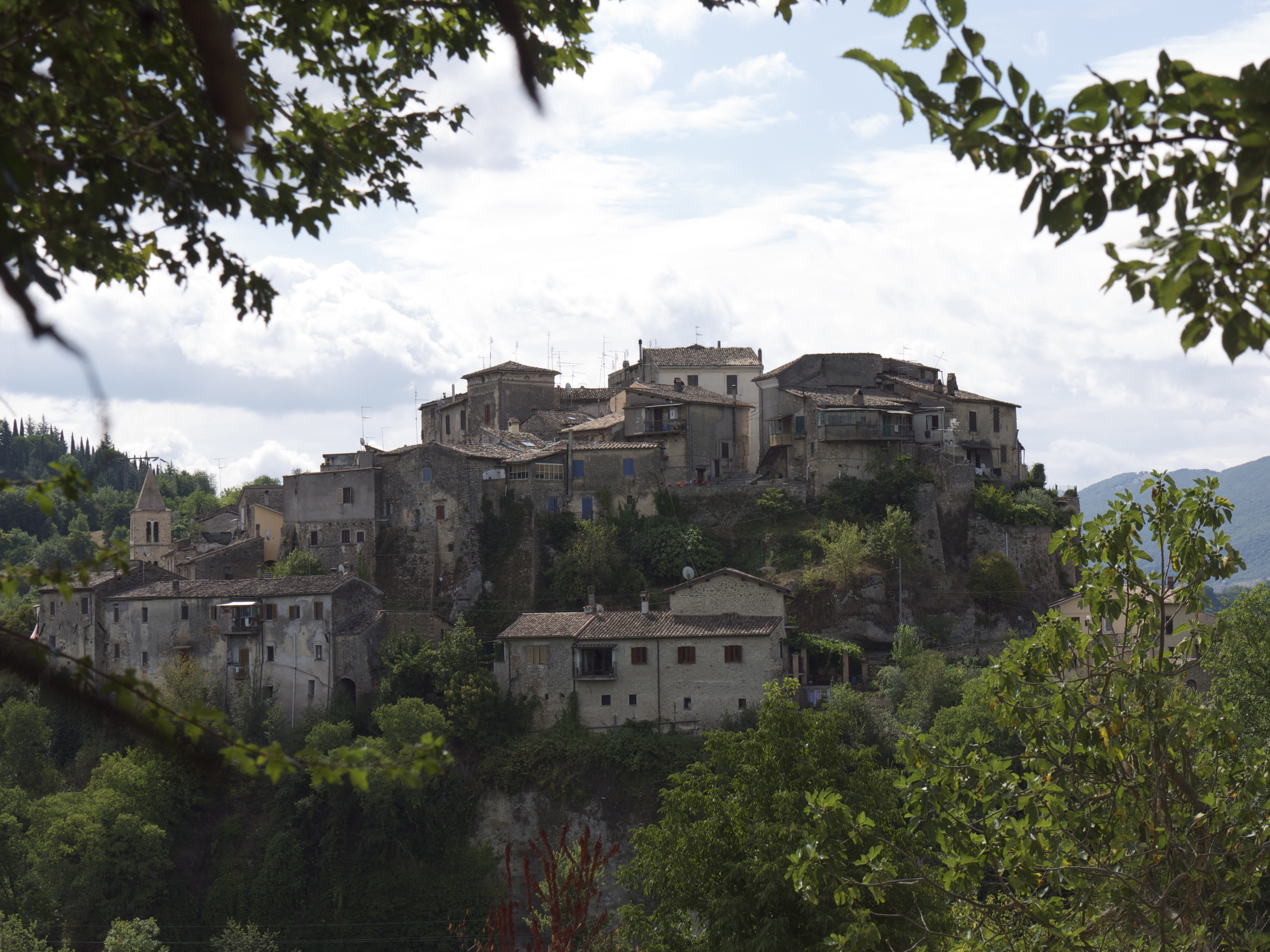
Panoramic view of Bocchignano

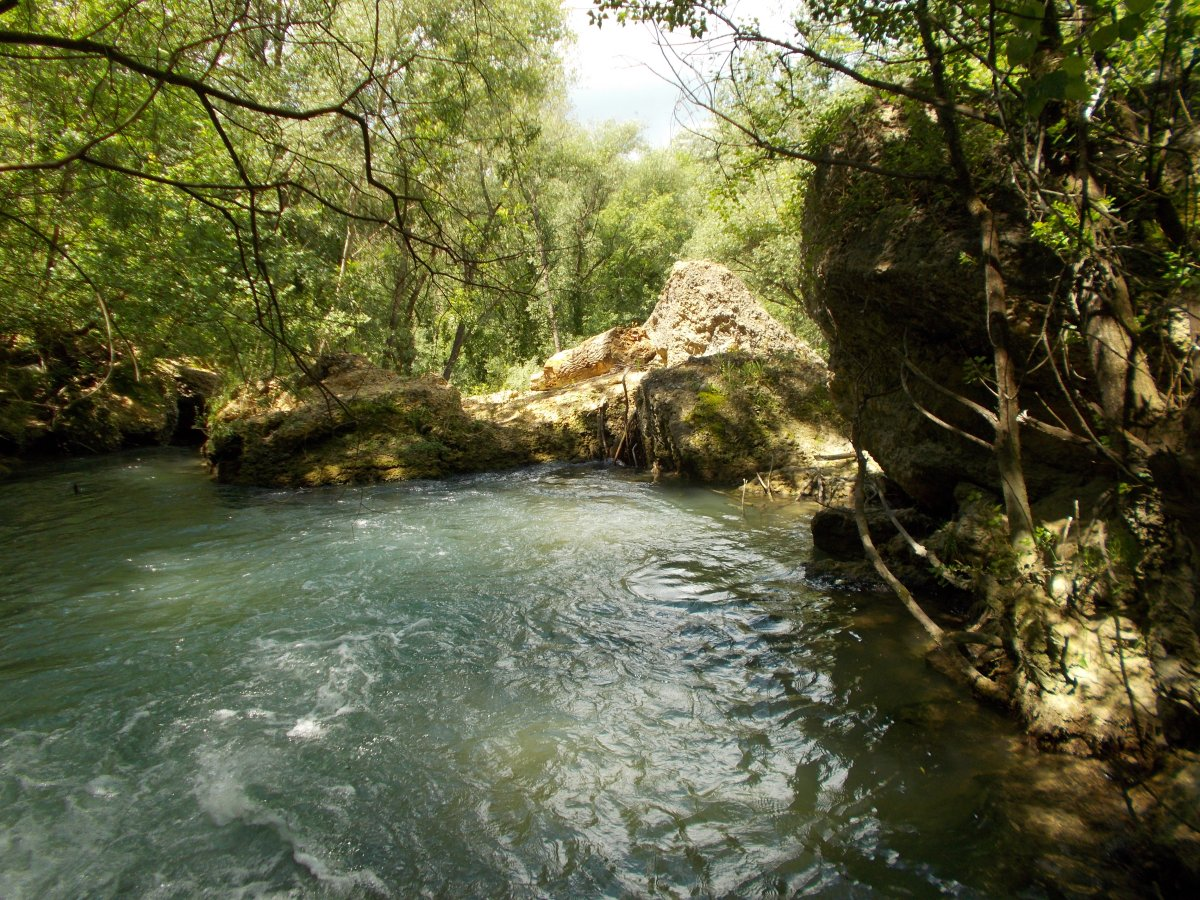
Remains of an ancient bridge over Farfa River at Ponte Sfondato

== Transport ==
Nearest railway station, Poggio Mirteto, is 7 km far and lies in Poggio Mirteto Scalo. It is part of the Roman suburban railway line FL1 Orte–Fiumicino, a line that crosses the southwestern corner of the municipal territory.
