= Enrico Sibilia =

Catholic cardinal (1861–1948)

His Eminence Enrico Sibilia
- Cardinal-Bishop of Sabina e Poggio Mirteto
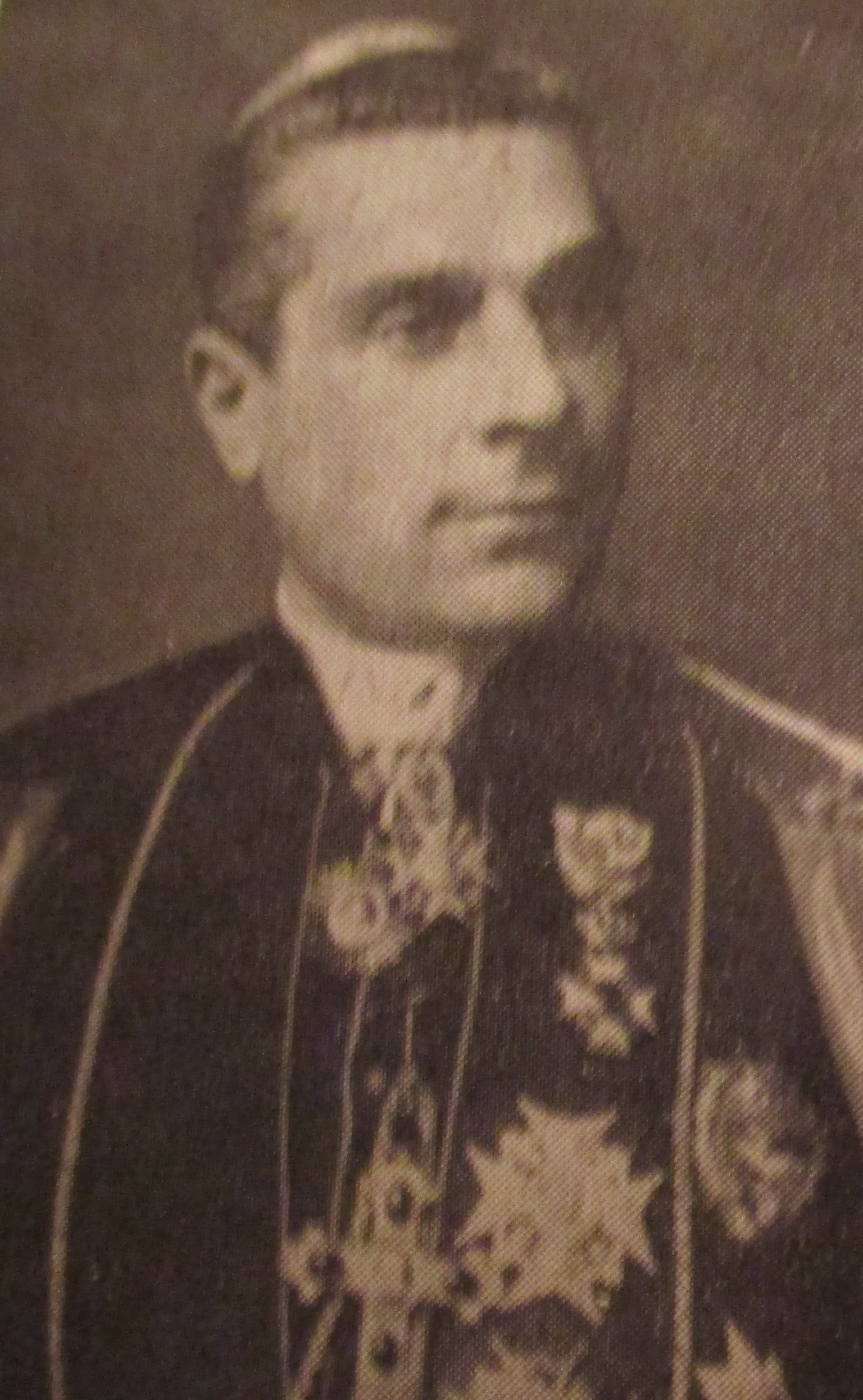
- Sibilia pictured circa 1939.
- Church: Roman Catholic Church
- Appointed: 11 December 1939
- Term ended: 4 August 1948
- Predecessor: Donato Raffaele Sbarretti Tazza
- Successor: Adeodato Giovanni Piazza
- Previous posts: Titular Archbishop of Side (1908–1935); Apostolic Internuncio to Chile (1908–1914); Apostolic Nuncio to Austria (1922–1935); Apostolic Pro-Nuncio to Austria (1935–1936); Cardinal-Priest of Santa Maria Nuova (1936–1939)

Orders
- Ordination: 8 March 1884 by Biagio Sibilia
- Consecration: 11 October 1908 by Rafael Merry del Val y Zulueta
- Created cardinal: 16 December 1935 by Pope Pius XI
- Rank: Cardinal-Priest (1936–1939); Cardinal-Bishop (1939–1948)

Personal details
- Born: Enrico Ulderico Vincenzo Sibilia; 17 November 1861 Anagni, Papal States
- Died: 4 August 1948 (aged 86) Anagni, Italy
- Parents: Achille Sibilia; Lucrezia Gianuzzi
- Education: Pontifical Roman Seminary

Styles of Enrico Sibilia
- Reference style: His Eminence
- Spoken style: Your Eminence
- Informal style: Cardinal
- See: Sabina–Poggio Mirteto (Suburbicarian diocese

Enrico Sibilia (17 March 1861 – 4 August 1948) was an Italian Roman Catholic Cardinal and former Nuncio to Austria.

== Early life and priesthood ==
He was born in Anagni. After entering the Seminary of Anagni and completing his basic studies he entered the Pontifical Roman Seminary. There, from 1878 until 1890, he studied for and received doctorates in philosophy, theology and a doctorate utroque iuris (in both canon and civil law).

He was ordained on 8 March 1884 by his uncle Biagio Sibilia, Bishop of Segni. He was appointed Honorary canon of the cathedral chapter of Anagni. He entered the diplomatic service of the Holy See in April 1890 and served as an Auditor of the nunciature in Colombia from 1890 to 1895 and was later promoted to chargé d'affaires serving in that role until 1898. He was created Honorary chamberlain of His Holiness on 21 December 1894. He returned to diplomatic work as an Auditor of the nunciature in Brazil from August 1898 to July 1901. He was transferred to the nunciature in Belgium until 1902 and again to Spain until 1908.

== Episcopate ==
Pope Pius X appointed him titular Archbishop of Side on 30 July 1908. He was appointed as internuncio to Chile when the apostolic delegation was elevated to that rank in 1908. He was consecrated on 11 October 1908 by Rafael Merry del Val, Cardinal Secretary of State. He returned to Rome in April 1914. He was appointed Assistant at the Pontifical Throne that same year. He was a Vicar of Vincenzo Vannutelli. He served as Nuncio in Austria since he was appointed there on 16 December 1922.

== Cardinalate ==
He was created Cardinal-Priest of Santa Maria Nova in the consistory of 16 December 1935 by Pope Pius XI. He received the red biretta from the president of Austria on 21 December 1935; and received the red hat from the Pope in 1936. He took part in the conclave of 1939 that elected Pope Pius XII. He was elected to the order of Cardinal-Bishops and suburbicarian see of Sabina e Poggio Mirteto on 11 December 1939.

He died in 1948 at the age of 87 and is buried in Anagni.

Catholic Church titles
Preceded by Donato Sbarretti	Cardinal-Bishop of Sabina-Poggio Mirteto; 11 December 1939 – 4 August 1948	Succeeded by Adeodato Giovanni Piazza
Records
Preceded by Gennaro Granito Pignatelli di Belmonte	Oldest living Member of the Sacred College; 16 February – 4 August 1948	Succeeded by Alessandro Verde
