= Suburbicarian Diocese of Sabina–Poggio Mirteto =

Roman Catholic diocese in Italy

Suburbicarian Diocese of Sabina–Poggio Mirteto Sabinensis–Mandelensis

Catholic
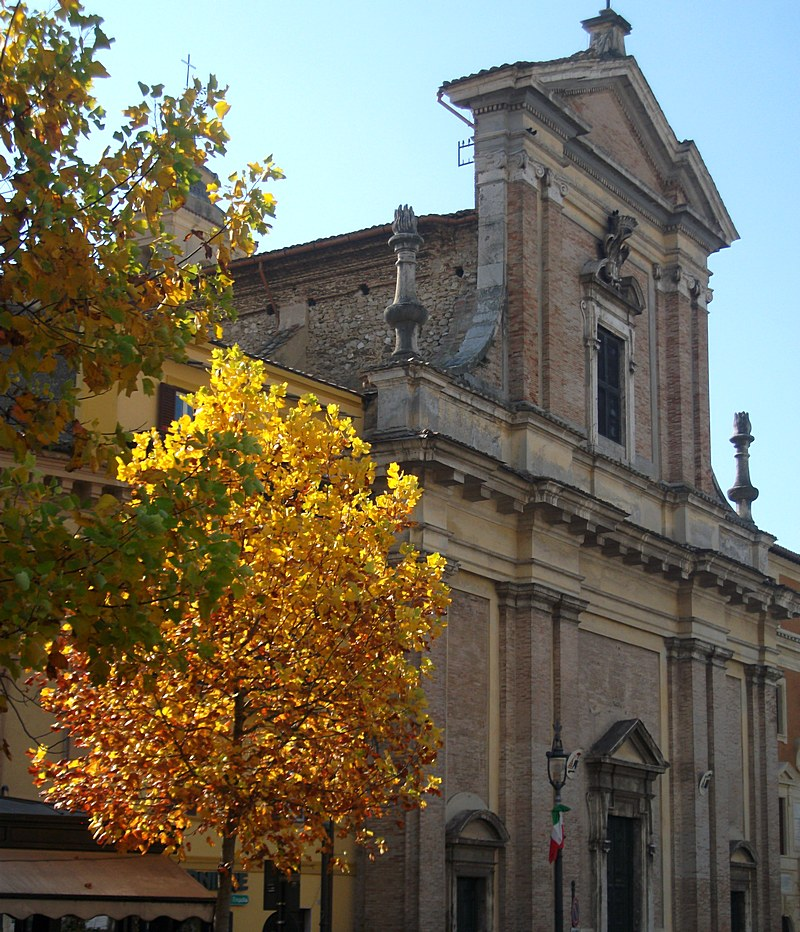
- Poggio Mirteto Cathedral

Location
- Country: Italy
- Ecclesiastical province: Rome

Statistics
- Area: 918 km^{2} (354 sq mi)
- Population: Total; Catholics: (as of 2014); 196,954; 182,478 (92.7%)
- Parishes: 82

Information
- Denomination: Catholic Church
- Rite: Roman Rite
- Established: 5th century
- Cathedral: Cattedrale di S. Maria Assunta (Poggio Mirteto)
- Co-cathedral: Concattedrale di S. Liberatore Vescovo e Martire (Magliano Sabina)
- Secular priests: 77 (diocesan); 29 (Religious Orders)

Current leadership
- Pope: Leo XIV
- Bishop: Giovanni Battista Re (Cardinal-bishop); Ernesto Mandara (Diocesan bishop)

Map
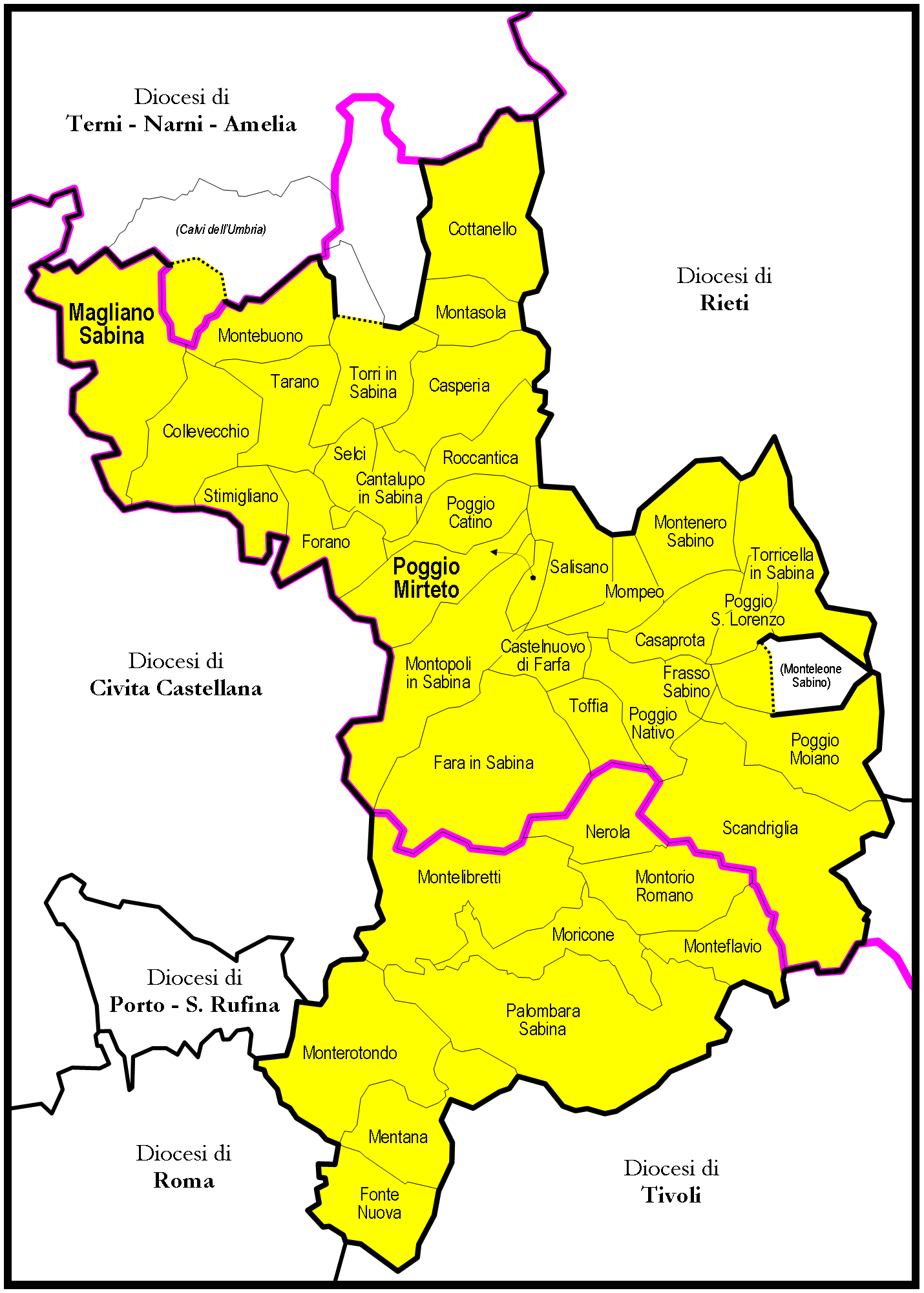

Website
- www.diocesisabina.it

The Diocese of Sabina–Poggio Mirteto is a Latin suburbicarian see of the Holy Roman Church (which means it carries the rare rank of cardinal-bishop) and a diocese of the Catholic Church in Italy in the Roman province of the Pope.

== History ==
=== Sabina ===
Sabina has been the seat of such a bishopric since the 6th century, though the earliest names in the list of bishops may be apocryphal.

The ancient cathedral of San Salvatore of Sabina was located in Forum Novum (Vescovio).

The official papal province of Sabina was established under Pope Paul V in 1605.

Since 1842 the Cardinal Bishop of Sabina has also borne the title of Territorial Abbot of Farfa.

=== Poggio Mirteto ===
The Diocese of Poggio Mirteto, in central Italia region Lazio's Province of Rieti (formerly in the province of Perugia), was a Latin bishopric from 1841 until its merger in to the Diocese of Sabina in 1925. Poggio Mirteto was previously under the jurisdiction of the Territorial Abbey of Farfa, which later passed to the Diocese of Sabina.

The diocese of Poggio Mirteto was established on November 25, 1841 from territory split off from the Roman Catholic Diocese of Rieti, the Diocese of Sabina and the suppressed Territorial Abbacy of San Salvatore Maggiore, whose old collegiate church became the cathedral, and a diocesan seminary was established.

The diocese had in the early 20th century 38 parishes, with 32,600 inhabitants, 2 religious houses of men and 8 of sisters, under whose direction were the schools for girls in several communes.

=== Sabina–Poggio Mirteto ===
Since 1925 (1925.06.03), the cardinalitial suburbicarian see of Sabina has been united to that of Poggio Mirteto, and has been officially named Sabina e Poggio Mirteto, since 1986 Sabina–Poggio Mirteto. Some of territory of Poggio Mirteto was returned to the other mother-bishopric, the Diocese of Rieti.

The current Cardinal-Bishop is Giovanni Battista Re, while the Ordinary of the Diocese is Bishop Ernesto Mandara.

== Cardinal-bishops of Sabina ==
If ?, century or c. is given, exact years or dates have not yet been found for his tenure.

=== To 1000 ===
- Mariano (721)
- Pietro (778 to before 799)
- Issa (or Jesse) (799 to before 804)
- Teodoro (804 to before 826)
- Samuele (826 before 853)
- Sergio (853–868, or before 879)
- Leone (879 to before 928)
- Gregorio (928 to before 948)
- Anastasio (948 to before 963)
- Giovanni (963 to before 984)
- Giovanni (984 to before 993)
- Domenico (993)
- Benedetto (999)
- Rainiero (999–1011)

=== 1000 to 1300 ===
- John of Crescenzi, future Pope (or Antipope) Sylvester III (1011–1062)
- Ubaldo (1063–1094), first cardinal-bishop
  - Regizzone (Regizzo) (1084/90–1092/97), pseudocardinal
- Crescenzio, seniore (1100–1106)
- Crescenzio, iuniore (1117-1126)
- Corrado della Suburra (1127/28–1153)
- Gregorio (1154)
- Gregorio de Suburra (1154–1163)
- Conrad of Wittelsbach (1166–1200)
  - Giovanni (1172–1173), pseudocardinal of Antipope Callisto III
- Giovanni di San Paolo (1204–1214)
- Peter of Benevento (1217–1220)
- Aldobrandino Orsini (1221)
- Olivier von Paderborn (1225–1227)
- Jean Halgrin d'Abbeville, O.Clun. (1227–1237)
- Goffredo da Castiglione, (1238–1241)
- William of Modena (1244–1251)
- Pierre de Bar (de Barro), Cistercian (1251/52–1253)
- Guido il Grosso (Guy le Gros) 1261–1265, elected Pope Clement IV
- Bertrand de Saint-Martin, Benedictine (1273–1277 or 1278)
- Gerardo Bianchi (1281–1302)

=== 1300–1500 ===
- Pedro Rodríguez (1302–1310)
- Arnaud de Falguières (Faugères) (1310–1317)
- Guillaume Pierre Godin, Dominican (1317–1336)
- Matteo Orsini, Dominican (1338–1340)
- Pedro Gòmez de Barroso (1341–1348)
- Bertrand de Déaulx (1348–1355)
- Egidio Albornoz (1356–1367)
- Guillaume d'Aigrefeuille, Benedictine (1367–1369)
- Philippe de Cabassoles (1370–1372)
- Jean de Blauzac (1372–1379)
- Hughes de Montelais (or Montrelaix) the younger, called de Bretagne (the obedience of Avignon 1379–1384)
- Pierre de Sortenac (or de Bernier) (the obedience of Avignon 1384–1390)
- Philippe Valois d'Alençon (Philippe d'Alençon) second son of Charles II, Count of Alençon (1380–1388) (deposed and reinstated by Pope Urban VI)
- Jaime de Aragón (the obedience of Avignon 1391–1392)
- Francesco Carbone Tomacelli, Cistercian (1405)
- Enrico Minutoli (or Minutolo) (1409–1412)
- Jean Flandrin (the obedience of Avignon 1405–1415)
- Pedro Fernández (de Frías) (1412–1420)
- Francesco Lando (1424–1427)
- Giordano Orsini (1431–1438)
- Branda da Castiglione (1440–1443)
- Basilios Bessarion (1449)
- Amedeo di Savoia (1449–1451), served as antipope Felix V 1439–1449
- Isidore of Kiev (Isidoro da Tessalonica) (1451–1462)
- Juan de Torquemada (1463–1468)
- Basilios Bessarion (again) (1468–1472)
- Alain de Coëtivy (1472–1474)
- Berardo Eroli (1474–1479)
- Giuliano della Rovere (1479–1483) (later Pope Julius II)
- Oliviero Carafa (1483–1503)

=== 1500–1700 ===
- Girolamo Basso della Rovere (1503–1507)
- Raffaele Riario (1507–1508)
- Giovanni Antonio Sangiorgio (1508–1509)
- Bernardino López de Carvajal (1509–1511, deposed, again 1513–1521)
- Francesco Soderini (1511–1513)
- Niccolò Fieschi (1521–1523)
- Alessandro Farnese (1523–1524)
- Antonio Maria Ciocchi del Monte (1524)
- Pietro Accolti (1524–1532)
- Giovanni Domenico de Cupis (1533–1535)
- Bonifacio Ferrero (1535–1537)
- Lorenzo Campeggio (1537–1539)
- Antonio Sanseverino (1539–1543)
- Antonio Pucci (1543–1544)
- Giovanni Salviati (1544–1546)
- Giovanni Pietro Carafa (1546–1550) (later Pope Paul IV)
- François de Tournon (1550–1560)
- Robert de Lenoncourt
- Giovanni Morone (1561–1562)
- Alessandro Farnese (1564–1565)
- Ranuccio Farnese (1565)
- Cristoforo Madruzzo, sometime between 1567 and 1578
- Tiberio Crispo (1565–1566)
- Giovanni Michele Saraceni (1566–1569)
- Giovanni Battista Cicala (o Cicada) (1569–1570)
- Otto Truchsess von Waldburg (1570)
- Giulio della Rovere (1570–1573)
- Giovanni Ricci (1573–1574)
- Scipione Rebiba (1574–1577)
- Giacomo Savelli (1577–1578)
- Giovanni Antonio Serbelloni (1578)
- Antoine Perrenot de Granvelle (1578–1586)
- Innico d'Avalos d'Aragona Order of Santiago (1586–1589)
- Tolomeo Gallio (1589–1591)
- Gabriele Paleotti (1591–1597)
- Ludovico Madruzzo (1597–1600)
- Girolamo Rusticucci (1600–1603)
- Simeone Tagliavia d'Aragonia (1603–1604)
- François de Joyeuse (1604–1611)
- Antonmaria Sauli (1611–1615)
- Benedetto Giustiniani (1615–1620)
- Pietro Aldobrandini (1620–1621)
- Odoardo Farnese (1621–1623)
- Bonifazio Bevilacqua Aldobrandini (1623–1626)
- Carlo Gaudenzio Madruzzo (1626–1629)
- Scipione Borghese (1629–1633)
- Felice Centini, OFMConv] (1633–1641)
- Francesco Cennini de' Salamandri (1641–1645)
- Carlo de' Medici (1645), Giovanni Carlo de' Medici
- Francesco Barberini (1645–1652)
- Bernardino Spada (1652–1655)
- Giulio Cesare Sacchetti (1655–1663)
- Marzio Ginetti (1663–1666)
- Francesco Maria Brancaccio (1666–1668)
- Giulio Gabrielli (1668–1677)
- Niccolò Albergati-Ludovisi (1677–1681)
- Pietro Vito Ottoboni (1681–1683)
- Carlo Pio di Savoia (iuniore) (1683–1689)
- Paluzzo Paluzzi Altieri degli Albertoni (1689–1691)
- Giannicolò Conti (1691–1698)
- Gasparo Carpegna (1698–1714)

=== 1700–1925 ===
- Fulvio Astalli (1714–1719)
- Francesco Pignatelli (1719–1724)
- Francesco Acquaviva d'Aragona (1724–1725)
- Pietro Ottoboni (1725–1730)
- Annibale Albani (1730–1743)
- Vincenzo Bichi (1743–1747)
- Raniero d'Elci (1747–1753)
- Silvio Valenti Gonzaga (1753–1756)
- Joaquín Fernàndez de Portocarrero Mendoza (1756–1760)
- Gian Francesco Albani (1760–1773)
- Carlo Rezzonico iuniore (1773–1776)
- Andrea Corsini (1776–1795)
- Giovanni Archinto (1795–1799)
- Giovanni Andrea Archetti (1800–1805)
- Ippolito Antonio Vincenti Mareri (1807–1811)
- Lorenzo Litta (1814–1820)
- Tommaso Arezzo (1820–1833)
- Carlo Odescalchi (1833–1838)
- Antonio Domenico Gamberini (1839–1841)
- Luigi Emmanuele Nicolo Lambruschini (1842–1847)
- Giacomo Luigi Brignole (1847–1853)
- Gabriele Ferretti (1853–1860)
- Girolamo D'Andrea (1860–1868)
- Karl August von Reisach (1868–1869)
- Giuseppe Milesi Pironi Ferretti (1870–1873)
- Luigi Bilio, Barnabite (1873–1884)
- Tommaso Martinelli, OSA (1884–1888)
- Luigi Serafini (1888–1894)
- Mario Mocenni (1894–1904)
- Francesco di Paola Cassetta (1905–1911)
- Gaetano de Lai (1911–1925 see below)

== Episcopal ordinaries of Poggio Mirteto ==
The first bishop was Nicolo Crispigni. The last was Cardinal Gaetano de Lai.

Bishops of Poggio Mirteto

- Angelo Rossi (1874.12.21 – 1882.01.24), later Bishop of Civitavecchia (Italy) (1882.01.24 – 1906.10.14), Bishop of Tarquinia (Italy) (1882.01.24 – death 1906.10.14)
- Luciano Saracani (1882.03.27 – 1888.06.01), emeritate as Titular Bishop of Epiphania (1888.06.01 – death 1892.08.23)
- Paolo de Sanctis (1888.06.01 – 1896.06.22), emeritate as Titular Archbishop of Sardica (1896.06.22 – death 1907)
- Domenico Ambrosi (1896.06.22 – 1899.12.19), later Bishop of Terracina (Italy) (1899.12.19 – 1921.08.17), Bishop of Priverno (Italy) (1899.12.19 – 1921.08.17), Bishop of Sezze (Italy) (1899.12.19 – death 1921.08.17)
- Giuseppe Gandolfi (1899.12.14 – 1906.09.26), later Bishop of Jesi (Italy) (1906.09.26 – death 1927.09.14)
- Archbishop-bishop Bartolomeo Mirra (1908.08.22 – death 1917.03.28), previously Titular Bishop of Amathus in Palæstina (1898.02.11 – 1907.04.15), Titular Archbishop of Auxume (1907.04.15 – 1908.08.22)
- Luigi Ferretti (1917.11.17 – 1924.03.24), later Bishop of Macerata (Italy) (1924.03.24 – 1934.11.26), Bishop of Tolentino (Italy) (1924.03.24 – 1934.11.26)
- Apostolic Administrator Gaetano De Lai (1924.08.07 – 1925.06.03), while Cardinal-Bishop of Sabina (from 1925 of Sabina e Poggio Mirteto) (1911.11.27 – 1928.10.24), Cardinal Vice-Dean of Sacred College of Cardinals (1919.03.23 – 1928.10.24), Superior General of Congregation of the Missionaries of Saint Charles Borromeo (Scalabrinians) (1924 – 1928.10.24)

== Cardinal-bishops of Sabina-Poggio Mirteto ==
- Gaetano de Lai (see above 1925–1928)
- Donato Sbarretti (1928–1939)
- Enrico Sibilia (1939–1948)
- Adeodato Giovanni Piazza (1949–1957)
- Marcello Mimmi (1958–1961)
- Giuseppe Ferretto (1961–1973)
- Antonio Samoré (1974–1983)
- Agnelo Rossi (1984–1995)
- Eduardo Francisco Pironio (1995–1998)
- Lucas Moreira Neves (1998–2002)
- Giovanni Battista Re (from 2002)

== Books ==
- Kehr, Paul Fridolin (1907). Italia pontificia (in Latin). Vol. II: Latium. Berlin: Apud Weidmannos. pp. 53–74.

== Sources and external links ==
- Suburbicarian Diocese of Sabina-Poggio Mirteto Official Website
- Complete list
- Konrad Eubel, Hierarchia Catholica Medii Aevi, vol. I-IV
- GCatholic with incumbent bio links
