= Nazzano =

- Comune
- Comune di Nazzano
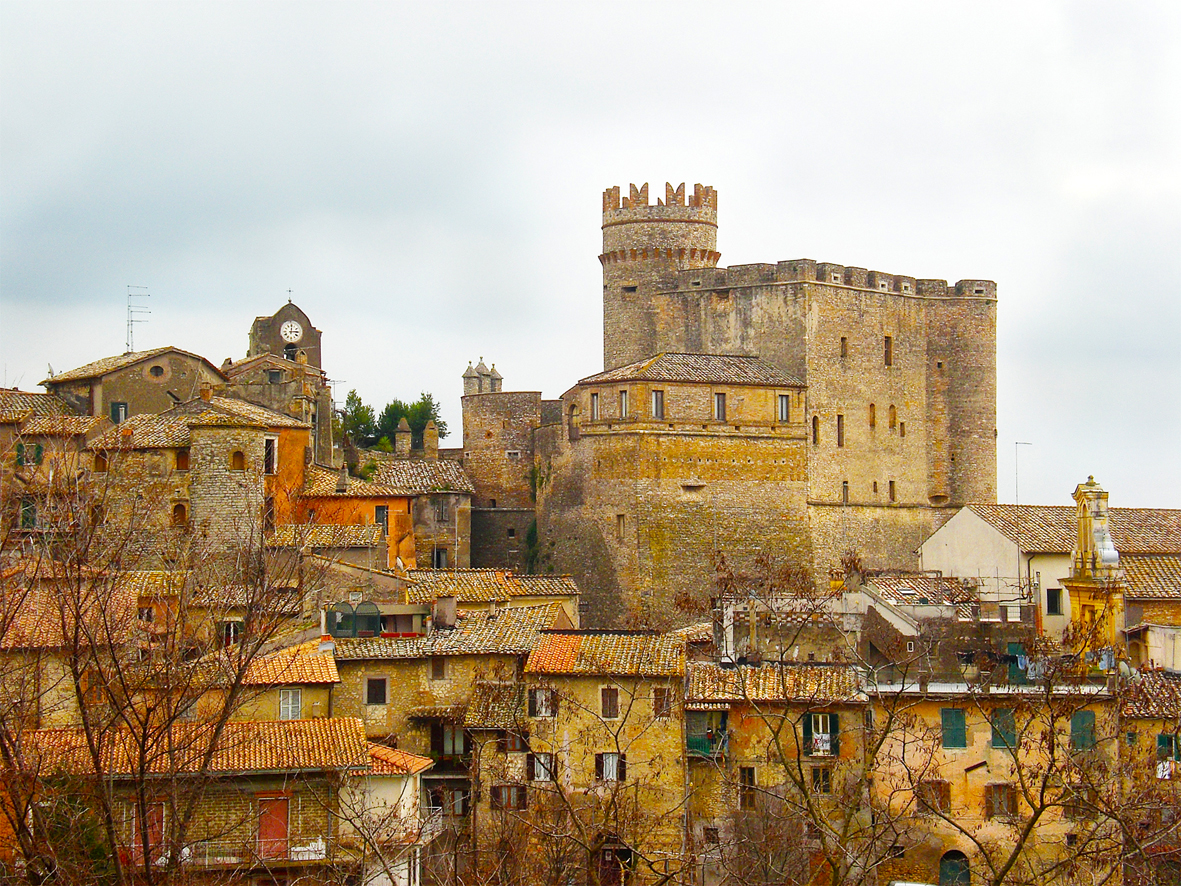
- Castle of Nazzano.

- Coat of arms

- Location within Italy Location within Lazio
- Coordinates: 42°14′N 12°36′E
- Country: Italy
- Region: Lazio
- Metropolitan city: Rome (RM)

Government
  - Mayor: Patrizio Gianferro

Area
  - Total: 12.2 km^{2} (4.7 sq mi)
- Elevation: 202 m (663 ft)

Population (30 November 2016)
  - Total: 1,426
  - Density: 117/km^{2} (303/sq mi)
- Demonym: Nazzanesi
- Time zone: UTC+1 (CET)
  - Summer (DST): UTC+2 (CEST)
- Postal code: 00060
- Dialing code: 0765
- Website: Official website

Nazzano is a comune (municipality) in the Metropolitan City of Rome in the Italian region Lazio, located about 40 kilometres (25 mi) north of Rome.

== Twin towns ==
- Iași, Romania, since 1999
