= Suburbicarian diocese =

Catholic dioceses around Rome, the titles of which can be assigned to cardinal bishops

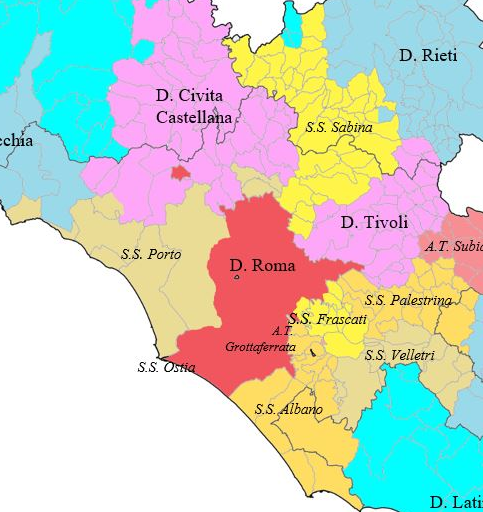
Map showing the dioceses of Lazio; the suburbicarian dioceses are in shades of yellow and gold with names in italics, preceded by S.S. (sede suburbicaria).

The seven suburbicarian dioceses (Latin: dioeceses suburbicariae, Italian: sedi suburbicarie) are Catholic dioceses located in the vicinity of Rome, whose (titular) bishops are the (now six) ordinary members of the highest-ranking order of cardinals, the cardinal bishops (to which the cardinal patriarchs were added). Pope Francis had, in addition, co-opted five cardinals of the Latin Church to join the ranks of the cardinal bishops.

Being awarded the title of a suburbicarian see is considered more an honor or prestige than aimed towards a functional intent.

== Seven suburbicarian sees ==
The suburbicarian dioceses have varied slightly over time and nowadays consist of:

See	Cathedral	Incumbent	Appointed
Ostia	Santa Aurea (Ostia Antica)	Luis Antonio Tagle	2026
Albano	Albano Cathedral (Albano Laziale)	Luis Antonio Tagle	2025
Sabina–Poggio Mirteto	Poggio Mirteto Cathedral	Giovanni Battista Re	2002
Velletri–Segni	Velletri Cathedral	Francis Arinze	2005
Porto–Santa Rufina	Cattedrale dei Sacri Cuori di Gesù e Maria (La Storta)	Beniamino Stella	2020
Frascati–Tusculum	Frascati Cathedral	Tarcisio Bertone	2008
Palestrina–Praeneste	Palestrina Cathedral	José Saraiva Martins	2009

The see of Ostia is conferred on the Dean of the College of Cardinals in addition to the see he already had. (Until 1914, the dean received the see of Ostia and Velletri in place of the see he had earlier. The sees of Ostia and Velletri were separated in 1914.) The cardinal-dean used to be the longest-serving cardinal bishop, but is now chosen by the six cardinal bishops with the approval of the Pope.

== Diocesan administration ==
The increasing involvement of the cardinal bishops in the administration of the papal curia resulted in a detachment from their dioceses. Therefore, some of them, in particular the cardinal-bishops of Sabina and Velletri, have for centuries had auxiliary bishops and in 1910 Pope Pius X's apostolic constitution Apostolicae Romanorum made this practice obligatory for all suburbicarian dioceses.

In 1962, Pope John XXIII in his decree Suburbicarii sedis made the cardinal bishops into titular bishops and made provision for the appointment of separate residential diocesan bishops for Velletri-Segni, Porto-Santa-Rufina, Frascati, Palestrina, Albano and Sabina. For the diocese of Ostia – the titular diocese of the dean of the College of Cardinals – no resident diocesan bishop was appointed; it is entrusted to an apostolic administrator, which is always the cardinal vicar of Rome. Though the diocesan bishops exercise all episcopal administrative functions, the cardinal bishops still formally take possession of their titular dioceses.

== See also ==
- Diocese of Rome#Suburbicarian sees
- Titular church
