= Marcelo Sánchez Sorondo =

Argentine Catholic bishop and author (born 1942)

The Most Reverend Marcelo Sánchez Sorondo
- Chancellor emeritus of the Pontifical Academy of Sciences; Chancellor emeritus of the Pontifical Academy of Social Sciences
- Sorondo in 2020
- Church: Catholic Church
- Appointed: 5 October 1998
- Term ended: 4 April 2022
- Successor: Peter Turkson
- Other posts: Secretary of the Pontifical Academy of Saint Thomas Aquinas (1999-); Titular Bishop of Vescovìo (2001-)

Orders
- Ordination: 7 December 1968 by Antonio Caggiano
- Consecration: 19 March 2001 by Pope John Paul II

Personal details
- Born: 8 September 1942 (age 84) Buenos Aires, Argentina
- Education: Pontifical University of Saint Thomas Aquinas; University of Perugia

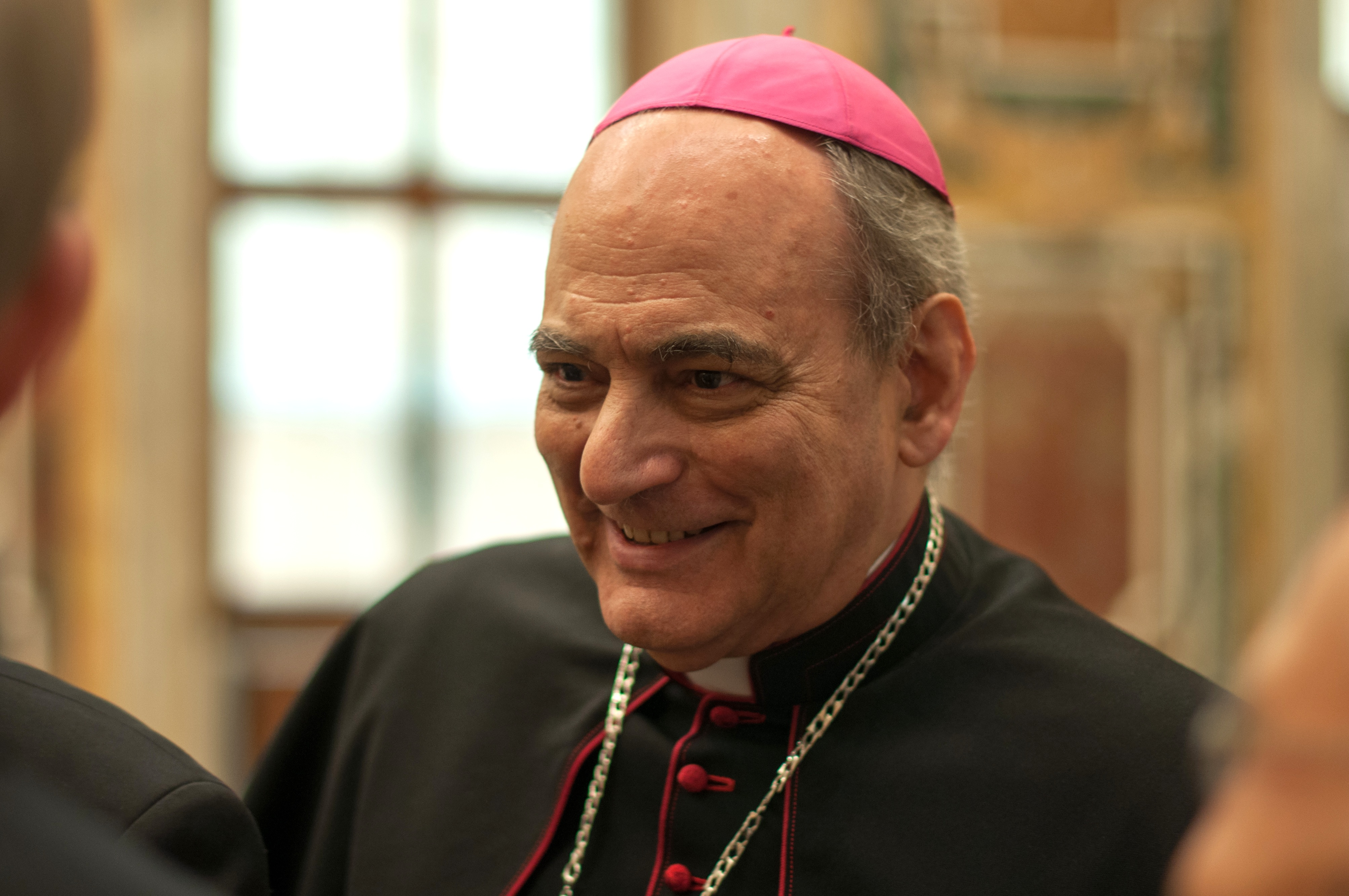
Sánchez Sorondo in 2013

Marcelo Sánchez Sorondo (born 8 September 1942) is an Argentine prelate of the Catholic Church who was Chancellor of the Pontifical Academy of Sciences and the Pontifical Academy of Social Sciences from 1998 to 2022. He was made a bishop in 2001. Having authored many publications in the sciences, he received several honors, including the Légion d’Honneur of France in 2000.

== Life ==
Born in Buenos Aires on 8 September 1942, he was ordained a priest of the Archdiocese of Buenos Aires on 7 December 1968. At the Pontifical University of St. Thomas Aquinas, Angelicum of Rome he was awarded a Ph.D. in sacred theology, the highest level of Church postgraduate studies, with the maximum possible grade of summa cum laude (1978) with the dissertation La gracia como participación de la naturaleza divina según Santo Tomás de Aquino.

In 1976 he graduated summa cum laude in philosophy at Perugia University. From 1976 to 1998 he was lecturer in the history of philosophy at the Lateran University in Rome where from 1982 on he was full professor in the same discipline. He was dean of the Faculty of Philosophy at the same university for three consecutive terms from 1987 to 1996.

From 1998 to 2014 he was full professor of the history of philosophy at the Libera Università Maria SS. Assunta (Rome) and in the same year was appointed president of the degree course in science of education. On 5 October 1998 he was appointed Chancellor of the Pontifical Academy of Sciences and of the Pontifical Academy of Social Sciences. In March 1999, he was also appointed Secretary Prelate of the Pontifical Academy of St. Thomas Aquinas. On 19 March 2001, Pope John Paul II consecrated him a bishop as titular bishop of Vescovio. On 19 July 2011, Pope Benedict XVI made him a member of the Pontifical Commission for Latin America.

In 2018, he declared that "those who are best implementing the social doctrine of the Church are the Chinese", praising China's emphasis on "the common good". He said: "China is evolving very well.... you can not think that the China of today is the China of John Paul II or the Russia of the Cold War". He contrasted its efforts with the Western world where the concept of the common good is little valued. His comments were widely criticized. Father Bernardo Cervellera, in an editorial in AsiaNews, wrote: "The bishop does not seem to see the slums of Beijing and Shanghai, the expulsion of migrants, the oppression of religious freedom. Appreciation for the Paris climate agreements, but silence on the links between wealth, corruption and pollution. An ideological approach that makes the Church a laughingstock."

On 4 April 2022, Pope Francis named Cardinal Peter Turkson to replace him as chancellor of both pontifical academies, and on 5 May, noting he had accepted Sánchez Sorondo's resignation, set Turkson's starting date as 6 June.

== Decorations and honours ==
Styles of Marcelo Sánchez Sorondo
- Reference style: The Most Reverend
- Spoken style: Your Excellency
- Religious style: Monsignor
- Posthumous style: not applicable

He was decorated as Cavaliere di Gran Croce of the Italian Republic (1999), official of honour of the Légion d’Honneur of France (2000), Grão Mestre da Ordem de Rio Branco of Brazil (2004), official of Austria (2004) and knight of Chile (2006). He was appointed Chaplain Grand Cross of Merit of the Sacred Military Constantinian Order of Saint George in 2006 by Infante Carlos, Duke of Calabria and Vice-Grand Prior of the Order in 2008.

== Main publications ==
- La Gracia como Participación de la Naturaleza Divina Según Santo Tomás de Aquino (Universidades Pontificias, Buenos Aires-Letrán-Salamanca, 1979), 360 pp.
- Aristotele e San Tommaso (Pontificia Università Lateranense, Città Nuova, Roma, 1981), 100 pp.
- Aristóteles y Hegel (Universidades Pontificias, Herder, Buenos Aires-Rome, 1987), 368 pp.
- 'La Noción de Participación en Juan Vicente', Salmanticensis (Salamanca, 1977).
- La Gracia como Participación de la Naturaleza Divina en Juan Vicente o. p. (from his doctoral thesis presented at the Pontifical University of St. Thomas Aquinas, Salamanca, 1978) 50 pp.
- 'La Positività dello Spirito in Aristotele', Aquinas, 21, fas. 1 (Rome, 1978), pp. 126 ss.
- 'La Querella Antropológica del Siglo XIII (Sigerio y Santo Tomás)', Sapientia, 35, 137-138 (Buenos Aires, 1980), pp. 325–358.
- Il Concetto di Storia della Filosofia (Rome, 1981), 50 pp.
- 'Aristóteles y Hegel' (N.Hartmann), introduction, translation and notes by M. S. S., Pensamiento, 154, vol. 39, (Madrid 1983), pp. 177–222.
- 'Partecipazione e Refusione della Grazia', in Essere e Libertà (studi in onore di C. Fabro, Perugia, 1984), pp. 225–251.
- 'L'Unità dei Comandamenti', Coscienza, 1, (Rome, 1985), pp. 20 ss.
- 'La Libertà nella Storia', in 'Ebraismo, Ellenismo, Cristianesimo', Archivio di Filosofia, 53, 2–3, (Rome, 1985), pp. 89–124.
- 'San Tommaso: Maestro Interiore', Tabor, 40, 4, (Rome 1991), pp. 22–42.
- L'Evoluzione (Entwicklung) Storica della Libertà come Stimolo per la Filosofia Cristiana', Aquinas, 30, 1, (Rome, 1988), pp. 30–60.
- 'Der Weg der Freiheit nach Hegel', in Der Freiheitsgedanke in den Kulturen des Italienischen und Deutschen Sprachraumes (Akademie Deutsch-Italienischer Studien, Akten der XXI. internationalen Tagung, Meran 10–15. April 1989), pp. 457–481.
- La Noción de Libertad en la Cuestión 'De Malo' de Santo Tomás (Buenos Aires 1991), 150 pp.
- L'Energeia Noetica Aristotelica come il Nucleo Speculativo del Geist Hegeliano', in M.S.S. (ed.), L'Atto Aristotelico e le sue Ermeneutiche (Rome, 1990), pp. 179–201.
- L'Atto Aristotelico e le sue Ermeneutiche, 'Introduction' by M. S. S. (Herder, Università Lateranense, Rome, 1990), pp. I-XII.
- Ragione Pratica, Libertà, Normatività, 'Introduction' by M. S. S. (Herder, Università Lateranense, Rome, 1991), pp. I-XXIV.
- 'Tomismo e Pensiero Moderno', in G.M.Pizzuti (ed.), Veritatem in Caritate (Ermes, Potenza, 1991), pp. 243–253.
- Teologia Razionale, Filosofia della Religione, Linguaggio su Dio, 'Introduction' by M. S. S. (Herder, Università Lateranense, Rome, 1992), pp. I-XVII.
- 'I Valori Culturali dell'America Latina per la Nuova Evangelizzazione', Euntes Docete, 45, 2, (Rome, 1992), pp. 191–204.
- 'Francisco de Vitoria: Artefice della Nuova Coscienza sull'Uomo', Vangelo Religioni Cultura (Turin, 1993), pp. 263–277.
- Physica, Naturphilosophie, Nuovi Approcci, 'Introduction' by M. S. S. (Herder, Università Lateranense, Rome, 1993, pp. I-XXVI.
- 'L'Idea di Università Spirituale in Pietro Rossano', in Sacro e Valori Umani (Agrigento, 1992), pp. 49–61.
- 'Del Alma al Espíritu: la Antropología de Tomás de Aquino', Revista Latinomericana de Filosofía, XXII, 1, (Buenos Aires, 1994) pp. 20–37.
- Per un Servizio Sapienziale della Filosofía nella Chiesa', Aquinas, XXXVII, fas. 3 (Rome, 1994), pp. 483–500.
- Perì Yuxhß, De Homine, Antropologia, 'Introduction' by M.S.S., Herder (Università Lateranense, Rome, 1995), pp. I-XXVIII.
- 'Stato, Libertà e Verità', in La Forma Morale dell'Essere, (Rosminiane, Stressa 1995), pp. 91–133.
- 'L'Amico come Altro se Medesimo e la sua Dialettica', in Akademie Deutsch-Italienischer Studien, Akten der XXII. internationalen Tagung, Meran 10–15. April 1994, pp. 457–481.
- 'Francis of Vitoria', in Hispanic Philosophy in the Age of Discovery, (The Catholic University of America, Washington 1995), Studies in Philosophy and the History of Philosophy, vol. 29, pp 59–68.
- 'La Libertà in C. Fabro', Studi Cattolici, September 1995, 415, pp. 529–33.
- 'Essere e Libertà in Fabro', in AA.VV., Cornelio Fabro: Testimonianze e Ricordi (Potenza, 1996), pp. 55–66.
- Tempo e Storia. Per un Approccio Storico e Teoretico, 'Introduction' by M.S.S. (Herder, Pont. Univ. Lateranense, Rome, 1996), XXXVI-442 pp.
- 'Dal Pensiero Greco il Primo Passo della Ragione verso Dio', in 'Le Idee', L'Unità2, 8 January 1998, p. 2.
- La Vita, edited with an Introduction by M.S.S. (Mursia, Università Lateranense, Rome, 1998), XXVIII-314 pp.
- 'Presentazione del Colloquio sull'Eucaristia', Aquinas, XLI, fas. 2 (Rome, 1998), pp. 209–21
- 'In che Cosa Credono quelli che non Credono?', Aquinas, XLI, fas. 3 (Rome, 1998), pp. 465–481.
- 'Aristotele', in Lexicon, Dizionario dei Teologhi (P.M., Casale Monferrato, 1998), pp. 101–104.
- 'Znaczenie filozofii wiedzy i umiejętności jako filozofii czołowieka', in Człowiek i jego świat na przełomie XX/XXI wieku, (Częstochowa 1998), pp. 37–44, 81–89.
- 'Hegel: Life between Death and Thought', Analecta Husserliana, LIX (Kluwer, Holland, 1999), pp. 189–203.
- 'Comentario à la Encíclica Fides et Ratio', Cuenta y Razón, (Madrid, April 1999), pp. 7–18.
- 'Il Problema della Sopravvivenza e dello Sviluppo Sostenibile', L'Osservatore Romano, 8 April 1999.
- 'Per una Istanza Metafisica Aperta alla Fede', in Per una Lettura dell'Enciclica Fides et Ratio (Quaderni de L'Osservatore Romano, Vatican City, 1999), pp. 158–171.
- ‘For a Metaphysics Open to Faith’, in Catholic Culture, Documents, L’Osservatore Romano, (Vatican City, 22 September), 1999, pp. 10–12, in Catholic Culture
- 'La Conferenza Mondiale sulla Scienza', Studium, fas. 6, (Rome 1999), pp. 867–870.
- 'La paz por el diálogo', in AA.VV, XV Aniversario de la firma del Tratado de Paz y Amistad entre las Repúblicas de Argentina y Chile, (Vatican City, 1999), pp. 3–10.
- 'La Teologia di Aristotele', in AA.VV., Pensare Dio a Gerusalemme, (Rome 2000), pp. 49–73.
- 'Food Needs of the Developing world in the Early Twenty-First Century', edited with an introduction by M.S.S, (Vatican City, 2000), X-475 pp.
- 'Science for Survival and Sustainable Development', edited with an Introduction by M.S.S., (Vatican City, 2000), pp. XII-427.
- 'La Strategia Filosofica di Fides et Ratio', Alpha Omega, III, fas. 2, (Rome 2000), pp. 329–339.
- 'The Social Dimensions of Globalisation', edited with a Foreword by M.S.S., (Vatican City, 2000), pp. 93.
- 'Science and the Future of Mankind - Science for Man and Man for Science', edited with an Introduction by M.S.S. (Vatican City, 2001), pp. XVII-527.
- 'Les Enjeux de la Connaissance Scientifique pour l'homme d'aujourd'hui', edited with an Introduction by M.S.S. (Vatican City, 2001), pp. XI-102.
- 'Per una Metafisica aperta alla Fede', Aquinas, XLIV, fas. 1 (Rome, 2001), pp. 35–47.
- 'Per una Rivalutazione della Nozione di Sapienza', Vita e Pensiero, LXXXIV, fas. 3 (Milano 2001), pp. 244–263.
- 'Los Desafíos del Cristiano à la luz de la Pontificia Academia de las Ciencias', Embajada Argentina de la Santa Sede, Ciclo de Conferencias, nro. 16, (Rome, 2001), pp. 1–24.
- 'Globalization Ethical and Institutional Concerns', edited by M.S.S. (Vatican City, 2001), pp. 408.
- 'Globalisation and Humanity: New Perspectives', in AA.VV, A Dialogue on Globalization: Challenges and Opportunities for Counhtries, (The Asia Group, Rome 2001), pp. 11–28.
- 'The new approach on Ethics of Sciences: COMEST-Berlin 2001', in World Commission on the Ethics of Scientific Knowledge and Technology, (UNESCO, Paris 2001), pp. 35–53.
- 'La dignità della persona: tra accanimento terapeutico e rischio di abbandono', in AA.VV., Etica e Vita Umana, (Crema 2001), pp. 32– 65.
- 'Problemi sul Cristianesimo', Nuntium, V, fas. 3, (Rome, 2001), pp. 49–63.
- 'The Challenger of Sciences - A Tribute to the Memory of Carlos Chagas', edited with an Introduction by M.S.S. (Vatican City, 2002), pp. XIX-168.
- 'The Pontifical Academy of Sciences: a Historical Profile in Education', in The Challenges for Science - Education for the Twenty-First Century, (Vatican City, 2002), pp. 272–290.
- 'Pontificia Accademia delle Scienze', in Dizionario Interdisciplinare di Scienza e Fede, (Città Nuova, Rome 2002), vol. 1, pp. 1084–1092.
- 'Sulla Verità della Scienza', Doctor Communis, II n.s., (Vatican City 2002), pp. 45–68.
- 'Science and Truth: Observations on the Truth of Science', Analecta Husserliana, vol. LXVII, (Kluwer Academic Publishers, London 2002), pp. 49–73.
- 'Globalización y Solidaridad', FundaciónBanco de Boston, (Buenos Aires, 2002), 43 pp.
- 'Globalizzazione e Solidarietà', Extra Series 15, (Vatican City 2002), 42 pp.
- 'Intergenerational Solidarity', edited by M.S.S., (Vatican City 2002), pp. 251.
- 'Globalisation and Inequalities', edited by M.S.S., (Vatican City 2002), pp. 192.
- 'Reflexiones sobre Dios en el siglo XX', in Nuntium, año 3, numero 6, (Madrid, Julio 2002), pp. 160–168.
- 'Terrorism, Culture and John Paul II', edited by M.S.S. and Caude Manoli, World Federation of Scientists, (Erice 2003), 183 pp.
- 'Globalisation and Terrorism', in Terrorism, Culture and John Paul II, (Erice 2003), pp. 45–75.
- 'Papal Addresses, to the Pontifical Academy of Sciences 1917-2002 and to the Pontifical Academy of social Sciences', edited with an Introduction, notes and index by M.S.S., (Vatican City 2003), pp. LIV-524.
- 'Il Padre e il Figlio amano se stessi e noi per lo Spirito Santo (Sth I 37 2)', in Doctor Communis, fasc. 2, (Vatican City 2003), pp. 41–57.
- 'The Truth Is the Goal of the Universe', in E. Majorana Center for Scientific Culture, (Erice, Italy, 10–15 May 2003), pp. 191–196.
- 'La rilettura storica speculativa della filosofia', in Audacia della ragione e inculturazione della fede, (Roma 2003), pp. 245–260.
- 'Una sintesi di umanesimo e scienza', in V. De Cesare (ed.), Per l'Europa, (Napoli 2003), pp. 58–61.
- 'For a Catholic Vision of the Economy', in Journal of Markets &Morality, Volume 6, Number 1, (Michigan 2003), pp. 7–31, Acton
- 'Per una cultura aperta alla fede', in La Chiesa a servizio dell'uomo, Giovanni Paolo II XXV anni di Pontificato, (Roma 2003), pp. 144–152.
- 'The Pontifical Academy of Sciences: A Historical Profile', The Pontifical Academy of Sciences, Extra Series 16, (Vatican City 2003), pp. 24.
- 'Cien Años de Magisterio Pontificio para las Ciencias', Pontificia Academia de las Ciencias, Extra Series 19, (Ciudad del Vaticano 2003), pp. 58.
- 'Science and Reality', Analecta Husserliana, vol. LXXIX, (Kluwer Academic Publishers, London 2004), pp. 821–833.
- 'The Four-Hundredth Anniversary of the Pontifical Academy of Sciences', edited with an Introduction and index by M.S.S., The Pontifical Academy of Sciences, Acta 17, (Vatican City 2004), pp. 170.
- 'The Governance of Globalisation', E. Malinvaud, L. Sabourin and M. S. S. (eds.), (Vatican City 2004), pp. XXXV-403.
- ‘Pour un nouvel humanisme scientifique’, in EWHUM (European Humanism in the World), posté 14 giugno 2004, in EWHUM
- 'Globalizar la solidaridad', Ciclo de Conferencias CEFOP, (La Plata, Provincia de Buenos Aires, 2004) pp. 58.
- 'Il Magistero dei Papi per la Pace e l'Accademia delle Scienze', in G. Prestipino (ed.), Guerra e Pace, (Napoli 2004), pp. 83–110.
- 'Globalisation and Solidarity', in A. D. Rotfeld (ed.), New Political Act for the United Nations, (Warsaw 2004), pp. 160–205.
- 'Human Security, Charity and Justice', in A. D. Rotfeld (ed.), New Threats, New Responses (Towards the UN Reform), (Warsaw 2004), pp. 130–135, PDF Report
- 'Globalisation, Justice and Charity', Extra Series 20, (Vatican City 2004), 20 pp.
- 'Globalizacion y Justicia Social', Extra Series 21, (Vatican City 2004), 28 pp.
- ‘Globalizzare la giustizia’, in I diritti umani nel mondo globalizzato, a cura di E. Conti, (Brescia 2004), pp. 61–74.
- ‘The Pontifical Academy of Sciences’, in Interdisciplinary Encyclopaedia of Religion and Science, ed. by G. Tanzella and A. Strumia, Roma 2005, Disf
- ‘Globalisation and Learning’, in Electronic Journal of Biotechnology, Vol. 8, No. 1, Issue of 15 April, Pontificia Universidad Católica de Valparaíso, (Chile 2005), in EJBiotechnology Journal
- Conceptualization of the Person in Social Sciences. (vol. Actas 11, pp. 510). ISBN 88-86726-18-X. VATICAN: The Pontifical Academy of Social Sciences (Vatican City).
- ‘El Padre y el Hijo se aman y nos aman por el Espíritu Santo’, in A. Galli, Homenaje al P. Ricardo Ferrara (Buenos Aires, 2006), pp. 80–120.
- ‘The Various Transcendent Levels of the Sacred in History: The East, Natural Religion, and Revealed Religion’ in M. S. S. (ed.), The Sacred, (The Pontifical Academy of St. Thomas Aquinas, Vatican City, 2006) pp. 69–81.
- ‘Femminismo e filosofia contemporanea’, in A. Luciani (ed.), Nuovo Femminismo (Carita Politica, Roma, 2006), pp. 35–64.
- ‘La educación como el arte de devenir sí mismo en un mundo globalizado’ In AA. VV. La educacion hoy, (Banco de Galicia, Buenos Aires, 2006), pp 35–58.
- ‘La liberta' della Scienza, in E. Conti (ed.), Le liberta' (Brescia, 2006), pp. 25-39.
- ‘Globalizacion y justicia internacional’, in E. D. Bautista (ed.), Globalización y justicia internacional, (Fondo de Cultura Económica, México, 2006), pp. 263–291.
- ‘Why the Concept of Brain Death is Valid as a Definition of Death’, in M. S. S. (ed.), The Signs of Death (The Pontifical Academy of Sciences, Vatican City, 2007), pp. xxi-xxix, 388–394.
- ‘Statement on Globalization and Education’, in M. S. S. (ed.), Globalisation and Education, (W. de Gruyter, Berlin, 2007), pp. 257–285.
- ‘Philosophy, Science, Faith’, in M. S. S. (ed.), What is our Real Knowledge about the Human Being, (The Pontifical Academy of Sciences, Vatican City, 2007), pp. 69–81.
- ‘Introduction’, in M. S. S. (ed.), Stem Cells Technology and Other Innovative Therapies, (The Pontifical Academy of Sciences, Vatican City 2007), pp. vii-xi.
- ‘Justice in Potency’, in M. S. S. (ed.), Charity and Justice Among Peoples and Nations, (The Pontifical Academy of Social Sciences, Vatican City 2007), pp. 150–165.

== See also ==
- List of foreign recipients of the Légion d'Honneur

Catholic Church titles
Preceded by Giovanni Battista Re	Titular Bishop of Vescovìo; 23 February 2001 – present	Incumbent
