= Tiber (disambiguation) =

The Tiber is an Italian river that flows through Rome.

Tiber may also refer to:

== Places ==
- Tiber Island, the island in the Tiber River in Rome
- Tiber Creek, the tributary of the Potomac River in Washington, D.C.
- Mad River (Ohio), the stream in Ohio also known as Tiber River
- Tiber Dam, the dam on the Marias River in Montana
- Lake Elwell, the lake in Montana also known as Tiber Reservoir
- Tiber Rocks, the group of rocks off the west coast of Graham Land
- Tiber Oil Field, the deepwater offshore oil field located in the Gulf of Mexico
- Tiber station, the light rail station in Sacramento, California

== Science ==
- TIBER (Threat Intelligence Based Ethical Red Teaming), a computer security standard
- Tiber Valley Project, the project conducted by the British School in Rome

== Arts ==
- Tiber Apollo, the marble sculpture of Apollo recovered from the Tiber River
- River Tiber (musician), the Canadian R&B singer
- Tiber Saxon, a character in the animated series Star Wars Rebels

== See also ==
- Tver, city in Russia
- Il Tevere, daily Italian Fascist newspaper (1924–1943)
