= Lucas Moreira Neves =

Brazilian Cardinal Bishop

His Eminence Lucas Moreira Neves O.P.
- Prefect of the Congregation for Bishops; President of the Pontifical Commission for Latin America
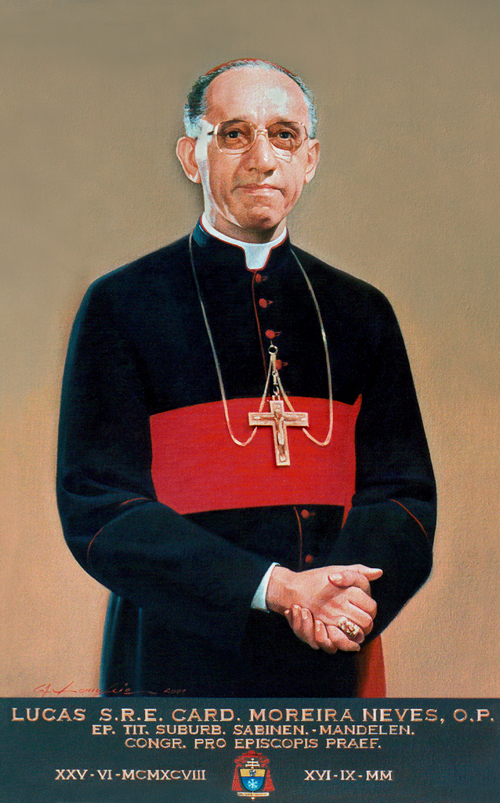
- Church: Roman Catholic Church
- Appointed: 25 June 1998
- Term ended: 16 September 2000
- Predecessor: Bernardin Gantin
- Successor: Giovanni Battista Re
- Other posts: Cardinal-Priest of Santi Bonifacio ed Alessio in commendam (1988–2002); Cardinal-Bishop of Sabina-Poggio Mirteto (1998–2002)
- Previous posts: Auxiliary Bishop of São Paulo (1967–74); Titular Bishop of Feradi maius (1967–79); Secretary of the Pontifical Council for the Laity (1974–79); Titular Archbishop of Feradi maius (1979–87); Secretary of the Congregation for Bishops (1979–87); Secretary of the College of Cardinals (1979–87); Titular Archbishop of Vescovìo (1987); Archbishop of São Salvador da Bahia (1987–98)

Orders
- Ordination: 9 July 1950 by Alexandre Gonçalves do Amaral
- Consecration: 26 August 1967 by Agnelo Rossi
- Created cardinal: 28 June 1988 by Pope John Paul II
- Rank: Cardinal-Priest (1988–98); Cardinal-Bishop (1998–2002)

Personal details
- Born: Lucas Moreira Neves; 16 September 1925 São João del Rei, Brazil
- Died: 8 September 2002 (aged 76) Rome, Italy
- Motto: De luce vigilo
- Coat of arms

Styles of Lucas Moreira Neves
- Reference style: His Eminence
- Spoken style: Your Eminence
- Informal style: Cardinal
- See: Sabina-Poggio Mirteto (suburbicarian see)

Lucas Moreira Neves, OP (16 September 1925 – 8 September 2002) was a Brazilian Catholic prelate who served as Prefect of the Congregation for Bishops from 1998 to 2000. He previously served as Archbishop of São Salvador da Bahia from 1987 to 1998. He was made a cardinal in 1988 and was a member of the Dominican Order.

== Biography ==
Moreira Neves was born in São João del Rei, in Minas Gerais state, Brazil. He was descended from Africans through his maternal grandfather.

He was ordained a priest on 9 July 1950. He was appointed Auxiliary Bishop of São Paulo by Pope Paul VI on 9 June 1967 with the titular see of Feradi Maius. He was consecrated on the following August 26th by Cardinal Agnelo Rossi as co-consecrators the Bishop of São João del Rei Delfim Ribeiro Guedes and the bishop of Porto Nacional Alain-Marie du Noday.

On 15 October 1979 he was appointed secretary of the Congregation for Bishops within the Roman Curia by Pope John Paul II. Moreira Neves left the Curia to take up the position of Archbishop of São Salvador da Bahia on 9 July 1967.

He entered the Roman Curia seven years later, on March 7, 1974 as vice-president of the Pontifical Council for the Laity.

He was created Cardinal-Priest of Ss. Bonifacio ed Alessio on 28 June 1988. Cardinal Moreira Neves served as President of the Bishops Conference of Brazil from 1995 to 1998.

Moreira Neves once again left Brazil for Rome to take up the position of prefect of the Congregation for Bishops to which he was appointed on 25 June 1998, when he was also elevated to the rank of Cardinal Bishop of Sabina-Poggio Mirteto. He resigned his position as prefect on 16 September 2000 as a result of his failing health.

Catholic Church titles
Preceded by Bernardin Gantin	Prefect of the Congregation for Bishops; 25 June 1998 – 16 September 2000	Succeeded by Giovanni Battista Re
