= Carriquiry =

Carriquiry is a surname. Notable people with the surname include:

- Alicia L. Carriquiry, Uruguayan statistician
- Ana Claudia Carriquiry, Miss Mundo Uruguay in 1980
- Guzmán Carriquiry Lecour, Uruguayan Roman Catholic activist
- Natalia Carriquiry, Chilean rhythmic gymnast at the 2006 South American Games
