= Giovanni Battista Re =

Italian cardinal (born 1934)

His Eminence Giovanni Battista Re
- Dean Emeritus of the College of Cardinals
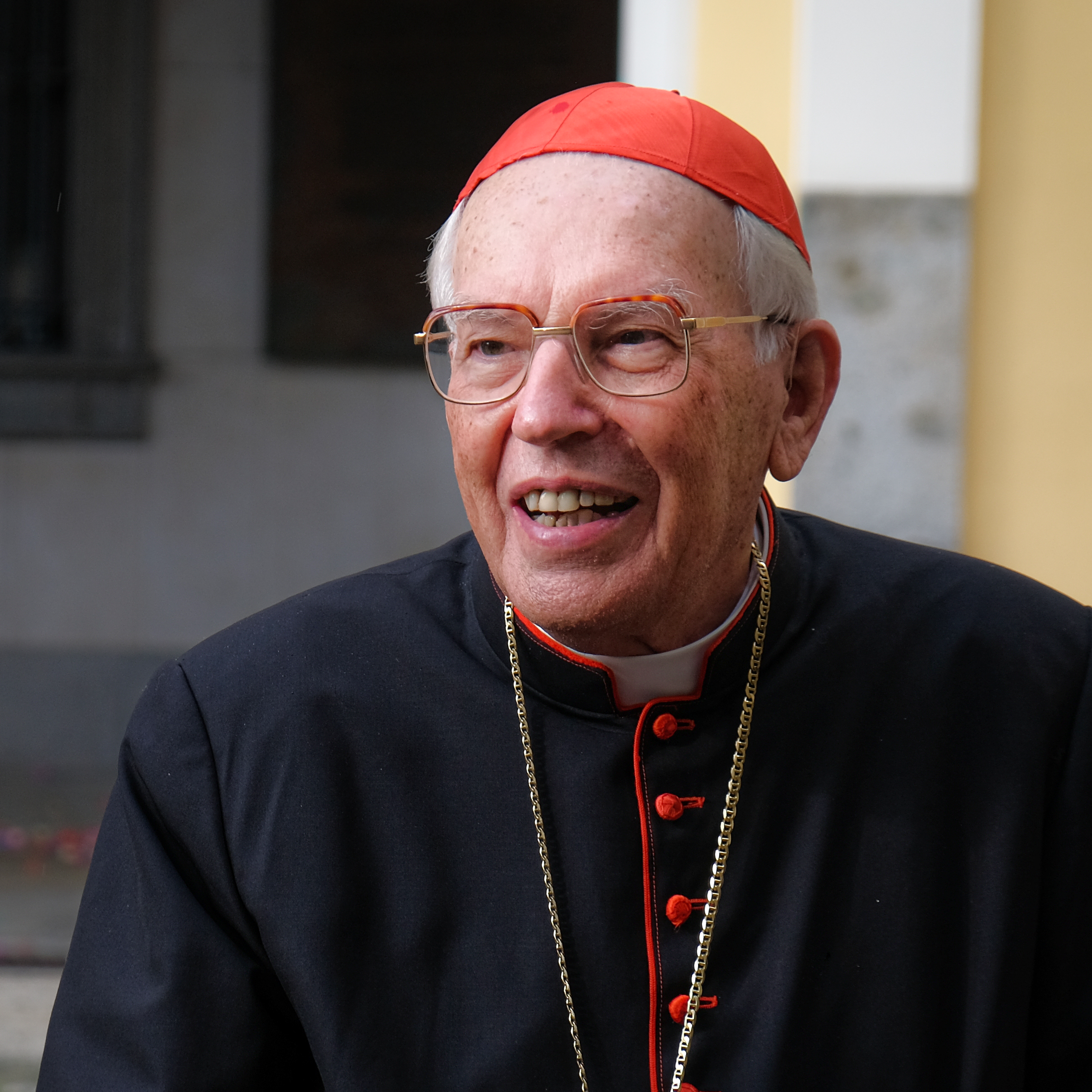
- Re in 2023
- Church: Roman Catholic Church
- See: Sabina-Poggio Mirteto; Ostia
- Appointed: 18 January 2020
- Term ended: 8 October 2026
- Predecessor: Angelo Sodano
- Successor: Luis Antonio Tagle
- Other post: Cardinal-Bishop of Sabina-Poggio Mirteto (2002–present)
- Previous posts: Secretary of the Congregation for Bishops (1987–1989); Titular Bishop of Forum Novum (1987–2001); Substitute for General Affairs (1989–2000); President of the Pontifical Commission for Latin America (2000–2010); Prefect of the Congregation for Bishops (2000–2010); Cardinal-Priest of Santi XII Apostoli (2001–2002); Vice-Dean of the College of Cardinals (2017–2020); Dean of the College of Cardinals (2020-2026); Cardinal-Bishop of Ostia (2020–2026)

Orders
- Ordination: 3 March 1957 by Giacinto Tredici
- Consecration: 7 November 1987 by Pope John Paul II
- Created cardinal: 21 February 2001 by Pope John Paul II
- Rank: Cardinal Priest (2001–2002); Cardinal Bishop (2002–present)

Personal details
- Born: 30 January 1934 (age 92) Borno, Kingdom of Italy
- Denomination: Roman Catholic
- Parents: Matteo Re (father)
- Motto: Virtus ex alto Strength from above

- Coat of arms

Styles of Giovanni Battista Re
- Reference style: His Eminence
- Spoken style: Your Eminence
- Informal style: Cardinal
- See: Ostia and Sabina-Poggio Mirteto (suburbicarian dioceses)

Giovanni Battista Re (born 30 January 1934) is an Italian Catholic prelate who served as Dean of the College of Cardinals from 2020 until 2026. He was made a cardinal in 2001 and served as prefect of the Congregation for Bishops from 2000 to 2010. As the most senior cardinal bishop in attendance, he chaired the 2013 conclave that elected Pope Francis.

== Early years ==
Born in Borno, Italy, the son of the carpenter Matteo Re (1908–2012), Giovanni Battista Re was ordained a priest by Archbishop Giacinto Tredici in Brescia on 3 March 1957. He holds a doctorate in canon law from the Pontifical Gregorian University, Rome, and taught in the Brescia seminary. To prepare for a diplomatic career, he entered the Pontifical Ecclesiastical Academy in 1961.

== Curial service ==
Re has been a member of the Roman Curia since 1963, where he served as personal secretary to Archbishop Giovanni Benelli. He was elevated to monsignor and served in various diplomatic positions before being named both bishop of the titular see of Forum Novum and secretary of the Congregation for Bishops on 9 October 1987. Pope John Paul II administered the episcopal consecration on 7 November.

=== Sostituto ===
On 12 December 1989, he became sostituto ("substitute") for general affairs of the Vatican's Secretariat of State, one of the key positions under the Cardinal Secretary of State.

=== Prefect of the Congregation of Bishops ===
Re was named on 16 September 2000 to head the Congregation for Bishops and the Pontifical Commission for Latin America. Re became Cardinal-Priest of Ss. XII Apostoli in the consistory held 21 February 2001, named first among those elevated. The next year, on 1 October, he was named Cardinal Bishop of Sabina-Poggio Mirteto. Re automatically lost his position as prefect on 2 April 2005 upon the death of John Paul II and was reconfirmed in office by Pope Benedict XVI on 21 April 2005. He held both positions until 30 June 2010.

==== Lincoln excommunications ====
In 1996, Bishop Fabian Bruskewitz of Lincoln, Nebraska, notified Catholics in his diocese that they would incur automatic excommunication if they belonged to groups that espoused beliefs that contradicted Catholic teaching, specifying Call to Action Nebraska, Catholics for a Free Choice, the Freemasons, the Hemlock Society, Planned Parenthood, and others. Call to Action challenged his authority to make such a declaration, asking the Congregation for Bishops to provide an "authoritative judgment of the Holy See". As prefect of the congregation, Re upheld Bruskewitz's action in 2006.

==== Wielgus scandal ====
Re, who as prefect of the Congregation of Bishops assisted the pope in deciding the future careers of the clergy, said, "When Monsignor Wielgus was nominated, we did not know anything about his collaboration [with the secret services]." Wielgus resigned his position as Archbishop of Warsaw on 6 January 2007, just one day after being installed in that post in a private ceremony, just before the start of his public installation, because of revelations that he cooperated with the Polish communist secret police decades earlier".

==== Society of Saint Pius X ====
In January 2009, Re published a decree removing the excommunications from the bishops of the Society of Saint Pius X. Cardinal Dario Castrillon Hoyos stated that if anyone in the Vatican should have known about Richard Williamson's negationist views, it was Re, whose congregation oversaw information about bishops and prelates.

==== Brazilian abortion ====
In March 2009, after an abortion on a nine-year-old girl raped by her stepfather and pregnant with twins had been performed to save her life, Archbishop José Cardoso Sobrinho of Olinda and Recife stated that automatic excommunication had been incurred by the girl's mother and the medical team. President Luiz Inácio Lula da Silva criticized what he called the archbishop's "conservative attitude" and health minister José Gomes Temporão directed his criticism against the Catholic Church's position, describing it as "extreme, radical and inadequate". In a comment to an Italian newspaper, Re deplored what he called an attack on the church in Brazil: "It is a sad case, but the real problem is that the twins conceived were two innocent persons, who had the right to live and could not be eliminated. Life must always be protected. The attack on the Brazilian church is unjustified." He added that excommunication of those who performed the abortion was just. The National Conference of Bishops of Brazil declared the Archbishop's statement mistaken.

==== Participation in cover-up of clergy sex abuse scandal; retaliation against Bishop Gumbleton ====
On 11 January 2006, Thomas Gumbleton testified at a hearing at the Ohio General Assembly in Columbus, Ohio, about sexual abuse in the Catholic church. The Assembly was considering a bill to create a legal window for victims of sexual abuse to sue the perpetrators. In his statement, Gumbleton endorsed the bill and called for all states to enact bills like this one. He also revealed that he was sexually abused by a priest as an adolescent while in the seminary.

According to an account given by Gumbleton in 2011, the bishops of Ohio opposed the proposed sexual abuse bill and were incensed by his testimony. They immediately complained to the Vatican about him. A few days later, Gumbleton received a letter from Cardinal Re, saying that Gumbleton had violated the solidarity of communio episcoporum (communion of bishops) by testifying for the bill in Ohio without the permission of the local bishop. Re ordered Gumbleton to resign immediately as auxiliary bishop and as pastor of St. Leo's Parish.

==== McCarrick scandal ====
As prefect of the Congregation for Bishops, Re played a central role in Benedict XVI's attempts to discipline former Cardinal Theodore McCarrick. Re's role in this matter came to light after Archbishop Carlo Maria Viganò's August 2018 "Testimony" made a number of specific statements regarding his involvement in the matter, which were clarified and expanded upon by subsequent reporting.

Viganò said that in 2000, Re, as newly appointed prefect of the Congregation for Bishops, opposed McCarrick's appointment as archbishop of Washington. This statement has been supported by reporting by the Catholic News Agency and by Andrea Tornielli and Gianni Valente's book Il Giorno del Giudizio.

Further, according to Tornielli and Valente, sometime after Bishop Paul Bootkoski of Metuchen, McCarrick's former see, reported to Nuncio Gabriel Montalvo Higuera on 5 December 2005, that his diocese had made at least one settlement with a former seminarian who accused McCarrick of sexual harassment, Re informed McCarrick in writing that negative reports about him had come to light. McCarrick was replaced as archbishop of Washington shortly after. In late 2006 or early 2007, after McCarrick had been replaced as archbishop and further reports of McCarrick's sexual assault of adults had reached Rome, Re sent McCarrick a letter via Nuncio Pietro Sambi in which he instructed him to leave the Redemptoris Mater seminary where he was living and to lead a life of retreat and prayer. These instructions were not obeyed. Following the April 2008 publication of Richard Sipe's "Statement for Pope Benedict XVI", Re sent McCarrick another written letter, which was presented to him at the nunciature by Nuncio Pietro Sambi, telling him to leave Redemptoris Mater and live in a monastery or become the chaplain of a home for the elderly run by nuns. In a letter of response, McCarrick refused Re's instructions and proposed instead that he live in a residence for priests in Washington, a parish in Washington, an apartment in Rome, or in a residence near an American Catholic university. He also argued that canceling all his pending invitations and public appearances would bring unwelcome attention. In a subsequently leaked communication to Fr. Anthony Figueiredo of 7 October 2008, McCarrick stated that "Cardinal Re has approved my moving to a parish and my Archbishop [Donald Wuerl] has been great in beginning to work that out". He also stated that he had agreed to make no public appearances either in the United States or abroad without Re's approval and to resign from all Roman and USCCB entities, and that Re had forbidden him to come to Rome. However, McCarrick continued to make many public appearances around the world and to travel to Rome in subsequent years, with no public objection from Re.

According to his August 2018 "Testimony", Viganò learned from a conversation with Re sometime between 16 July 2009 and 30 June 2010 (Note: The timing of this conversation is unclear, but according to Viganò, happened while Re was still Prefect and after Viganò had been transferred to the Vatican City Governatorate.) that Benedict XVI had imposed disciplinary measures (which Viganò inaccurately referred to as "canonical sanctions") on McCarrick that required him to leave Redemptoris Mater seminary and forbade him to celebrate Mass in public, take part in public meetings, give lectures, or travel. While Vigano's original statement gives the impression that he believed that Re was telling him about new events rather than actions that had been undertaken in 2007–2008, a subsequent October 2018 statement clarifies that the 2009-2010 time frame referred to the time when Re told him of these measures, not the time at which the measures were implemented.

Re has refused to speak about his involvement in the matter of McCarrick to journalists.

=== Other positions ===
Re was a member of various offices of the Curia. In May 2008, Pope Benedict named him a member of the Pontifical Council for Legislative Texts. He was also a member of the Congregation for the Doctrine of the Faith, Congregation for the Evangelization of Peoples and the Congregation for the Oriental Churches in addition to the Administration of the Patrimony of the Apostolic See. He held these memberships until his 80th birthday.

== College of Cardinals ==
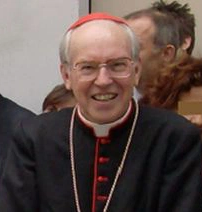
Re in 2009

Re was one of the cardinal electors who participated in the 2005 papal conclave that elected Pope Benedict XVI. He was identified by numerous commentators before and during the 2005 conclave as a potential successor to John Paul II.

When Pope Benedict XVI resigned on 28 February 2013, Cardinal Angelo Sodano, the dean of the College of Cardinals, and Cardinal Roger Etchegaray, the subdean, were over the age of 80 and therefore ineligible to participate in the conclave to elect his successor. Re, as the senior cardinal elector, presided over the conclave that elected Cardinal Jorge Mario Bergoglio as Pope Francis. At the new pope's inauguration on 19 March 2013, Re was one of the six cardinals who made a public profession of obedience to the new pope on behalf of the College of Cardinals. (Note: Re and Tarcisio Bertone represented the cardinal-bishops; Joachim Meisner and Jozef Tomko represented the cardinal priests; and Renato Martino and Francesco Marchisano represented the cardinal-deacons.)

On 10 June 2017, Pope Francis approved Re's election as subdean of the College of Cardinals by the cardinals of the suburbicarian sees (dioceses in the suburbs of Rome). On 18 January 2020, Pope Francis approved his election to a five-year term as dean of the College of Cardinals by the nine Latin Church cardinal bishops, and to a second five-year term as dean on 7 January 2025.

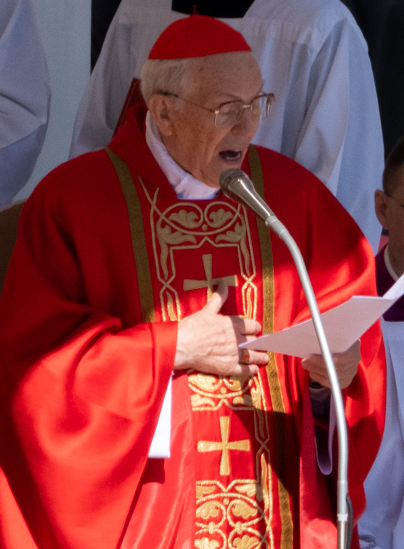
Cardinal Giovanni Battista Re officiates the funeral mass for Pope Francis in 2025.

As Dean of the College of Cardinals, Re along with Pope Francis presided over the funeral of Pope Benedict XVI on 5 January 2023. It was the first funeral for a retired pope since Pope Gregory XII, who resigned in 1415 and died two years later. Two years later, on 26 April 2025, Re officiated at the funeral of Pope Francis. He presided over the General Congregations of the College of Cardinals leading to the 2025 papal conclave and presided at the Missa Pro Eligendo Romano Pontifice on the morning of 7 May 2025, before the conclave started later that afternoon. He was too old to be an elector and therefore did not preside over the conclave. (Note: The task of presiding over the conclave fell to the senior cardinal bishop in the conclave, Pietro Parolin.)

At 92, he stepped down as Cardinal Dean on 9 October 2026 after his resignation was accepted by Pope Leo XIV. He was succeeded by Filipino Cardinal Luis Antonio Tagle, concurrently serving as Pro-Prefect of the Dicastery for Evangelization.

== Notes ==
Catholic Church titles
Preceded by Lucas Moreira Neves	Secretary of the Congregation for Bishops; 9 October 1987 – 12 December 1989	Succeeded by Justin Francis Rigali
Preceded by Lucas Moreira Neves	Secretary of the College of Cardinals; 9 October 1987 – 12 December 1989	Succeeded by Justin Francis Rigali
Preceded by Lucas Moreira Neves	— TITULAR — Archbishop of Vescovìo (pro illa vice); 9 October 1987 – 21 February 2001	Succeeded by Marcelo Sánchez Sorondo
Preceded by Edward Idris Cassidy	Substitute for General Affairs; 12 December 1989 – 16 September 2000	Succeeded by Leonardo Sandri
Preceded by Lucas Moreira Neves	Prefect of the Congregation for Bishops; 16 September 2000 – 30 June 2010	Succeeded by Marc Ouellet
Preceded by Lucas Moreira Neves	President of the Pontifical Commission for Latin America; 16 September 2000 – 30 June 2010	Succeeded by Marc Ouellet
Preceded by Agostino Casaroli	Cardinal Priest of Santi XII Apostoli; 21 February 2001 – 1 October 2002	Succeeded by Angelo Scola
Preceded by Lucas Moreira Neves	Cardinal Bishop of Sabina-Poggio Mirteto; 1 October 2002 – present	Incumbent
Preceded by Roger Etchegaray	Vice-Dean of the College of Cardinals; 10 June 2017 – 18 January 2020	Succeeded by Leonardo Sandri
Preceded by Angelo Sodano	Dean of the College of Cardinals; 18 January 2020 – 9 October 2026	Succeeded by Luis Antonio Tagle
