= Emilce Cuda =

Argentine professor and Catholic theologian (born 1965)

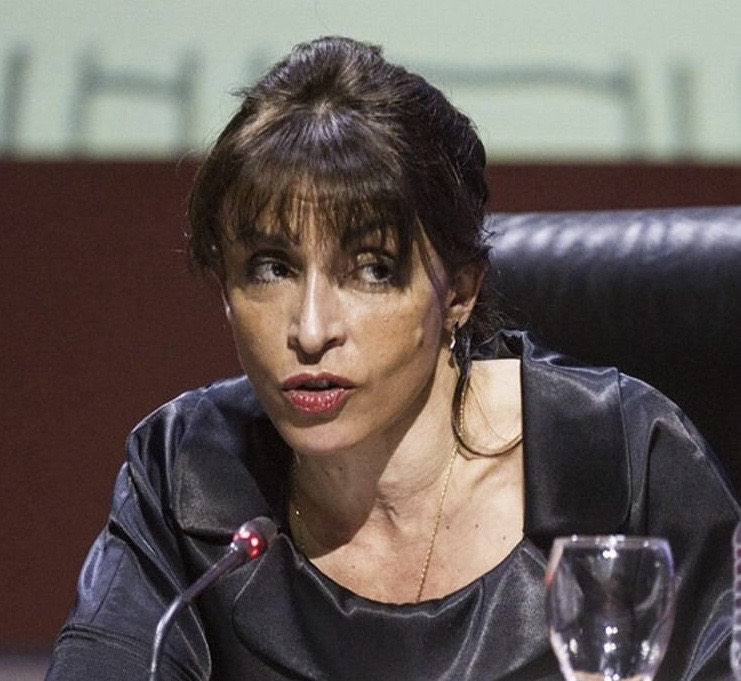
- People and Politics panel Oct 2015
- Born: 26 December 1965 (age 60); Buenos Aires, Argentina
- Notable work: Para Leer a Francisco
- Theological work
- Tradition or movement: Theology of the People
- Notable ideas: people-poor-worker (In Spanish, pueblo-pobre-trabajador)

Emilce Cuda (born 26 December 1965) is an Argentine Catholic theologian, university professor, and Roman Curia official.

Dubbed "the woman who knows how to read Pope Francis", she became known for interpreting the teachings of Pope Francis through the Argentine Theology of the People, political philosophers, and her own native exposure to Pope Francis’ cultural milieu. Under Pope Leo XIV she has continued to play a role in articulating the theological and social themes of the Latin American Church within the Holy See.

She is the first Argentine laywoman to receive a pontifical Doctor of Sacred Theology degree in moral theology and the first woman to hold an executive position in the Pontifical Commission for Latin America, a position she continues to occupy under Leo XIV.

== Education ==
Cuda earned her Bachelor of Sacred Theology (1990), master's degree and university professorship in Theology and Philosophy (1992), Licentiate of Sacred Theology (2005) and Doctor of Sacred Theology (2010) from the Pontificia Universidad Católica Argentina (UCA). Her STD diploma was signed by UCA Grand Chancellor / Archbishop of Buenos Aires Jorge Mario Bergoglio (later Pope Francis), and UCA Rector Víctor Manuel Fernández, now a cardinal and Prefect of the Dicastery for the Doctrine of the Faith of the Roman Curia.

Cuda undertook philosophical studies at the Universidad de Buenos Aires (UBA) from 1984-1990 and postgraduate political science at Northwestern University in 2011. She received an MBA (2002) from the Universidad de Ciencias Empresariales y Sociales.

== Work ==
Before her appointment to the Roman Curia, she was a research professor at Arturo Jauretche National University (UNAJ) and a visiting professor at the UCA and the UBA. She was a visiting research professor in residence at Boston College (2016) and DePaul University (2019). She served as an advisor and professor for the Episcopal Conference of Latin America (CELAM), through its social school CEBITIPAL. She collaborated with the Dicastery for Promoting Integral Human Development of the Roman curia of the Holy See, with the International Catholic Migration Commission (ICMC) of Geneva in the program "The Future of Work. Labor after Laudato Si and Post Covid 19", with The Economy of Francesco, with the Episcopal Conference of Argentina, and with the Pastoral Juvenil de la Arquidiócesis de Los Angeles.

She is a visible figure in academic, ecclesial and social organizations in Latin America.

She is Adjunct Assistant Professor at Loyola University Chicago.

She is a member of the global network Catholic Theological Ethics in the World Church(CTEWC). where she was coordinator for Latin America and the Caribbean between 2016 and 2018.

She appears frequently at conferences and on-line panel discussions, speaking chiefly on labor issues and the Church's social magisterium. Her approach is based on pontifical social encyclicals, Catholic cultural and intellectual history, Latin American popular culture and politics, and uniquely Argentine elements such as tango lyrics.

Her formulation ‘pueblo-pobre-trabajador’ does not render directly into English, in which people and poor are not the connotative singular nouns that they are in Spanish. Resonating with Pope Francis's phrase "God’s holy faithful people" and the preferential option for the poor of Catholic social teaching, Cuda's phrase suggests that the poor, destitute as they may be, are the workers who make up the people where grace operates.

== Curial service ==
On 26 July 2021, Pope Francis named Cuda as Head of Office of the Pontifical Commission for Latin America (PCAL). She took up her responsibilities at the Vatican on 1 September. On 18 February 2022 Pope Francis promoted her to secretary of the Commission, on an equal footing with its other secretary Rodrigo Guerra López.

On 13 April 2022 Pope Francis appointed her to the Pontifical Academy of Social Sciences.

On 19 May 2022 Pope Francis appointed her to the Pontifical Academy for Life.

National Catholic Reporter wrote in 2022, "Her intense focus on the issues at hand, combined with her indefatigable commitment to the work, has — based on her quick ascendancy in Rome — earned her the strong approval of Francis, who is insisting that what happens at the Vatican and beyond is motivated by Catholic social teaching."

The PCAL is an autonomous body presided over by the Prefect of the Dicastery for Bishops. At the time of Cuda’s appointment, the position was held by Cardinal Marc Ouellet. He was succeeded in January 2023 by Robert Francis Prevost, who was elected Pope Leo XIV in May 2025. Because of her association with both Francis and Leo XIV, she has been referred to as "the lady of two popes."

== Honors and Awards ==
On 14 December 2022, the National University of Rosario conferred on her the degree of Doctor of Humane Letters, in honoris causa. Pope Francis sent a hand-written letter of thanks to the university for the recognition as "a deserved distinction for the academic, intellectual and personal merits of Emilce (Cuda), a tireless fighter for social justice, peace, decent work and the beauty of creation, especially in Latin America".

On 9 May 2023, Loyola University Chicago conferred on her the honorary degree of Doctor of Humane Letters, honoris causa "in recognition of her distinguished career and scholarship, commitment to social justice, and service on behalf of the poor and marginalized." In announcing the honor, the university highlighted her contributions to understanding the pontificate of Pope Francis and her role in organizing the 2022 Building Bridges North–South encounter between the Pope and university students across the Americas.

On October 5, 2025, the William Sadlier Dinger Award and the National Catholic Council for Hispanic Ministry presented her with their annual award in recognition "for outstanding work in nurturing the Word of God within the Latino community."

On 21 October 2026, the Catholic University of Córdoba in Argentina conferred on her the degree of Doctora Honoris Causa "“for her distinguished career in social moral theology and her valuable contribution to the development of the theology of the people and Latin American social thought, as well as her commitment to a synodal Church that ‘goes forth toward the peripheries.’ Particular recognition is given to her leadership as Secretary of the Pontifical Commission for Latin America, her promotion of theological formation through partnerships among Jesuit universities across the continent, such as the Catholic University of Córdoba, and her tireless efforts to foster dialogue, encounter, and ecclesial collaboration.” (author’s translation from Spanish). Speaking at the ceremony, Cardinal Ángel Sixto Rossi SJ, archbishop of Córdoba, Argentina and chancellor of the university, stated, Thanks to Pope Francis' keen insight, we have the honor today of engaging with one of the most influential Catholic thinkers of our time, whose work has broken down historical barriers within the Church." (author's translation from Spanish}.

On October 23, 2026, the Universidad Provincial de Córdoba (UPC) awarded her its maximum distinction of Honorary Professor. "The designation as Honorary Professor recognizes her contributions to contemporary social thought and her ability to link academic production with debates on work, social rights and care for the environment." (author's translation from Spanish}

On 17 November 2026, the Argentine Chamber of Deputies awarded her the Mención de Honor "Diputado Nacional Dr. Juan Bautista Alberdi", the highest distinction awarded by the chamber, in recognition of her academic and institutional contributions and her commitment to interreligious dialogue, democracy, and social justice. The award was proposed by National Deputy Eduardo Valdés and presented at a ceremony attended by Chamber President Martín Menem at the National Congress in Buenos Aires. Menem praised Cuda's contributions, stating that "the trajectory of Emilce Cuda teaches us that knowledge acquires special value when placed at the service of others."

== Personal life ==
She is married to an American and has two children. She spends part of the year at a family home in Arizona.

== Para Leer a Francisco - Reading Francis ==
Reading Francis – Theology, Ethics and Politics (Spanish: Para Leer a Francisco – Teologia, Etica y Politica) was published in 2014. Prefaced by Scannone, it examines the theological and philosophical underpinnings of Pope Francis’ writings. Spanish newspaper ABC wrote, "It allows us to delve into the main lines of Theology of the People, covering the pastoral and ethical implications of the decisions approved by the Latin American episcopate held in Aparecida."

== Selected works ==
- Democracia y Catolicismo en Estados Unidos: 1792–1945. Democracy and Catholicism in the United States. (ISBN 978-9876401173) PhD thesis. 2010. In Spanish.
- Democracia en el Magisterio Pontificio. Democracy in the Pontifical Magisterium. (ISBN 978-9876403139) Masters thesis. 2014. In Spanish.
- Para leer a Francisco. Teología, ética y política. Reading Francis. (ISBN 978-9875002180) 2016. In Spanish. Translated into Italian in 2018.
- Nuevos Estilos Sindicales en América Latina y el Caribe. (Editor). New Styles of Labor Unions in Latin America. (ISBN 978-987-722-227-2). 2016. In Spanish.
- Hacia una ética de la participación y la esperanza. (Editor) Toward an Ethic of Participation and Hope. Prologue by James Keenan SJ. (ISBN 978-958-781-056-1). 2017 In Spanish.
