= Eduardo Martínez Somalo =

Spanish cardinal of the Catholic Church (1927–2021)

His Eminence Eduardo Martínez Somalo
- Camerlengo of the Holy Roman Church
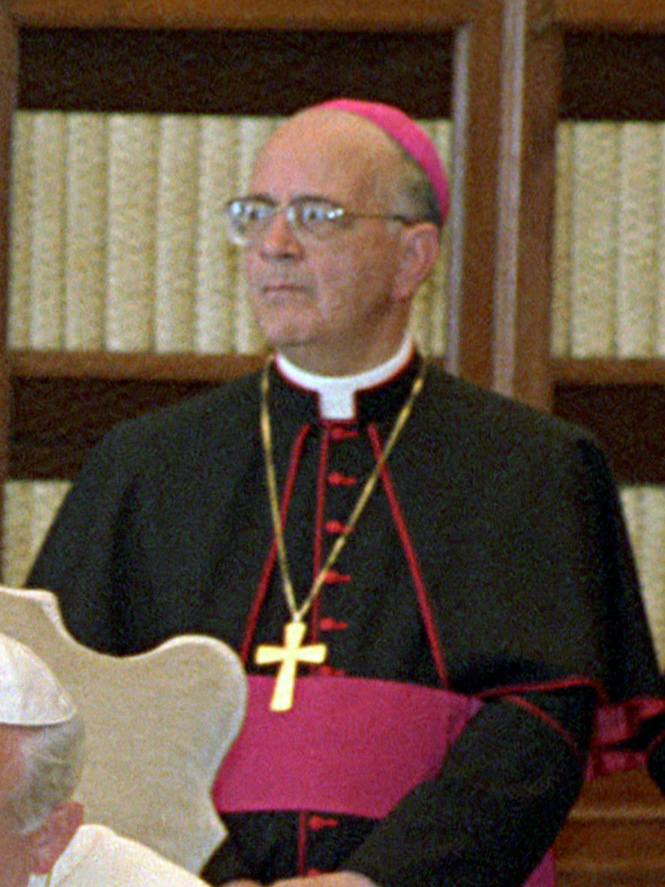
- Martínez Somalo in 1987
- See: Thagora (titular)
- Appointed: 5 April 1993
- Term ended: 4 April 2007
- Predecessor: Sebastiano Baggio
- Successor: Tarcisio Bertone
- Other post: Cardinal Priest of Santissimo Nome di Gesù (1999–2021)
- Previous posts: Apostolic Nuncio to Colombia (1975–1979); Substitute for General Affairs of the Secretariat of State (1979–1988); Prefect of the Congregation for Divine Worship and the Discipline of the Sacraments (1988–1992); Prefect of the Congregation for Institutes of Consecrated Life and Societies of Apostolic Life (1992–2003)

Orders
- Ordination: 19 March 1950 by Luigi Traglia
- Consecration: 13 December 1975 by Jean-Marie Villot
- Created cardinal: 28 June 1988 by Pope John Paul II
- Rank: Cardinal deacon (1988–1999); Cardinal priest (1999–2021)

Personal details
- Born: Eduardo Martínez Somalo; 31 March 1927 Baños de Río Tobía, Kingdom of Spain
- Died: 10 August 2021 (aged 94) Vatican City
- Denomination: Roman Catholic
- Education: Pontifical Gregorian University; Pontifical Lateran University
- Coat of arms

Styles of Eduardo Martínez Somalo
- Reference style: His Eminence
- Spoken style: Your Eminence
- Informal style: Cardinal

Eduardo Martínez Somalo (Spanish pronunciation: [eˈðwaɾ.ðo maɾˈtineθ/maɾˈtines soˈmalo]; 31 March 1927 – 10 August 2021) was a Spanish prelate of the Catholic Church who spent most of his career in the Roman Curia, first in the Secretariat of State from 1956 to 1975 and from 1979 to 1988, and then leading two of its principal dicasteries: the Congregation for Divine Worship from 1988 to 1992 and the Congregation for Institutes of Consecrated Life from 1992 to 2004.

He was made a cardinal in 1988 and held the post of Camerlengo of the Holy Roman Church from 1993 to 2007, serving as administrator of the Holy See from the death of Pope John Paul II to the election of Pope Benedict XVI.

Earlier in his career he was the apostolic nuncio to Colombia from 1975 to 1979.

== Early life and ministry ==
Martínez Somalo was born in Baños de Rio Tobia in La Rioja. He studied at the seminary of the Diocese of Calahorra y La Calzada-Logroño. He continued his studies in Rome at the Pontifical Spanish College and the Pontifical Gregorian University, earning licentiates in theology and canon law.

He was ordained a priest on 19 March 1950 and worked for several years in the administration of the Diocese of Calahorra and teaching at the Instituto Marco Fabio Quintiliano. To prepare for a diplomatic career he entered the Pontifical Ecclesiastical Academy in 1954.

On 18 August 1956 he received a doctorate in canon law from the Pontifical Lateran University; his thesis topic was the Spanish concordat of 1953. He then entered the Roman Curia, serving in the Secretariat of State, where he was responsible for the Spanish section. He also taught at the Ecclesiastical Academy from 1957 to 1970.

He served for several months in the Apostolic Delegation to Great Britain in 1970, but in October of that year returned to the Secretariat of State.

On 12 November 1975, Pope Paul VI appointed him titular archbishop of Thagora and Apostolic Nuncio to Colombia. He received his episcopal consecration on 13 December.

== Curial service ==
Pope John Paul II named him Substitute for General Affairs of the Secretariat of State on 5 May 1979.

Pope John Paul announced on 30 May 1988 that he would make him a cardinal and did so on 28 June 1988, assigning him as a cardinal deacon the title of Santissimo Nome di Gesù. He opted to join the order of cardinal priests on 9 January 1999. He was thought a likely candidate to head the Secretariat of State when the post became vacant in December 1990, but was probably not appointed because the Polish pope thought it best to fill the position with an Italian.

He was prefect of the Congregation for Divine Worship and the Discipline of the Sacraments from 1 July 1988 to 21 January 1992 and prefect of the Congregation for Institutes of Consecrated Life and Societies of Apostolic Life from 21 January 1992 to 11 February 2004, when he resigned. While in that post, he collaborated with other senior prelates to obtain the release of former Chilean dictator Gen. Augusto Pinochet from house arrest in Great Britain in 2000. In 2001, he responded to reports that his congregation had failed to respond to reports of abuse of nuns by priests in Africa and many other countries by appointing a committee to investigate, but declined to comment publicly. During his tenure as prefect his congregation issued a ruling that transsexuals be prohibited from entering religious orders and that anyone who had undergone sex-change surgery be expelled or suspended from their order. A letter outlining the policy was sent to the heads of religious orders, but otherwise kept secret.

In April 2010, a journalistic investigation identified Martínez Somalo as one of several senior curial officials who had supported Marcial Maciel, the founder of the Legion of Christ who was expelled from the priesthood in 2006, despite numerous charges of serious misconduct against him. Martínez Somalo accepted cash payments from Maciel while heading the dicastery responsible for "investigating any complaints about religious orders or their leaders". He took no action on 1997 reports that Maciel had abused nine seminarians. Martínez Somalo refused to be interviewed about Maciel and the Legion.

== Camerlengo ==
On 5 April 1993 Martínez was named Camerlengo of the Holy Roman Church, an office of special importance when the papacy is vacant. He held that post until 4 April 2007. He was the acting sovereign of Vatican City for 17 days from the death of Pope John Paul II to the election of Pope Benedict XVI.

As camerlengo, Martínez Somalo was responsible for verifying the death of Pope John Paul. Just minutes after his death, he performed the traditional ritual, proclaimed he had died, and removed his ring. He presided at certain of his funeral rites. On 8 April, Martínez Somalo read Psalm 41:2 before the coffin was closed and the Mass of Requiem begun. On 16 April, at the last meeting of the College of Cardinals before the conclave to elect a new pope began on 18 April, Martínez Somalo used a silver hammer to crush John Paul's ring and destroyed his lead seal as well.

== Health and death ==
He had bypass surgery in 2003 and a heart attack in July 2021. He died at his home in Vatican City on 10 August 2021 at the age of 94.

== Decorations ==
- Grand Officer of the Order of Merit of the Italian Republic (1972)
- Grand Cross of the Order of Isabella the Catholic (1983)
- Knight Grand Cross of the Order of Merit of the Italian Republic (1985)

Diplomatic posts
Preceded by Angelo Palmas	Apostolic Nuncio to Colombia; 12 November 1975 – 5 May 1979	Succeeded by Angelo Acerbi
Political offices
Preceded by Sotero Sanz Villalba	Assessor for General Affairs; 1970 – 12 November 1975	Succeeded by Giovanni Coppa
Preceded by Giuseppe Caprio	Substitute for General Affairs; 5 May 1979 – 23 March 1988	Succeeded by Edward Idris Cassidy
Catholic Church titles
Preceded by Carlo Livraghi	Titular Archbishop of Thagora; 12 November 1975 – 28 June 1988	Succeeded by Cipriano Calderón Polo
Preceded by Michele Pellegrino	Cardinal Deacon of Santissimo Nome di Gesù; 28 June 1988 – 9 January 1999	Gianfranco Ghirlanda
Preceded by Paul Mayer	Prefect of the Congregation for Divine Worship and the Discipline of the Sacraments; 1 July 1988 – 21 January 1992	Succeeded by Antonio María Javierre Ortas
Preceded by Jean Jerome Cardinal Hamer	Prefect of Congregation for Institutes of Consecrated Life and for Societies of Apostolic Life; 21 January 1992 – 11 February 2004	Succeeded by Franc Rode
Preceded by Sebastiano Baggio	Camerlengo of the Holy Roman Church; 5 April 1993 – 4 April 2007	Succeeded by Tarcisio Bertone
Preceded by Duraisamy Simon Lourdusamy	Cardinal Protodeacon; 29 January 1996 – 9 January 1999	Succeeded by Pio Laghi
Himself as Cardinal-Deacon	Cardinal Priest 'pro hac vice' of Santissimo Nome di Gesù; 9 January 1999 – 10 August 2021	Succeeded by Absolved
