= Cipriano Calderón Polo =

Spanish prelate of the Catholic Church

Cipriano Calderón Polo (1 December 1927 – 4 February 2009) was a Spanish prelate of the Catholic Church who worked as a journalist, editor, spokesperson, and administrator as an expert in explaining Church affairs to the Spanish-language public and in helping two popes, Paul VI and John Paul II, manage their relationship with the bishops of Latin America. After becoming a bishop in 1989, as vice president of the Pontifical Commission for Latin America, he became known as "the pope's man for Latin America".

== Biography ==
Cipriano Calderón Polo was born in Plasencia, Spain, on 1 December 1927. He was inspired to become a priest by the example of his uncle, a parish priest. Before he turned thirteen he entered the minor seminary there. He studied at the Pontifical University of Comillas in Santander until 1948 and then lived at the Spanish Pontifical College of Saint Joseph in Rome, where he attended the Pontifical Gregorian University, graduated with degrees in philosophy and theology. He also earned a diploma in journalism.

On 19 March 1953, he was ordained a priest. He returned to Rome to study for a doctorate in theology at the Pontifical Lateran University and combined his academic work with journalism. Over the next decade he was the Vatican correspondent for several Spanish and Latin American magazines and news agencies, including the Catholic newspaper YA in Madrid , the Logo agency, the Spanish Catholic press agency Prensa Asociada and numerous provincial church newspapers. He also acted as correspondent for some secular newspapers such as La Vanguardia of Barcelona and La Gaceta del Norte of Bilbao.

After completing his degree he became a lecturer at the archdiocesan seminary of Zaragoza and then director of the seminary of Segovia. He returned to Rome as vice-rector of the Pontifical Spanish college. In 1958 he taught for a semester at the Universidad Autónoma de Santo Domingo in the Dominican Republic.

At the beginning of the Second Vatican Council he became rector of the Spanish Pontifical College of Rome and between 1962 and 1965 he was employed by the Holy See's Secretariat of State as head of its Spanish-language press office. He became the "official Spanish voice of the Council". As an official observer, he attended all sessions of the Council. During the Council, Calderón was writing a biography of the Archbishop Giovanni Battista Montini of Milan. The book was published just a month after Montini became Pope Paul VI on 21 June 1963.

In 1968, he accompanied Pope Paul VI on his visit to Bogota, his first overseas journey as pope, after which the pope decided to start the weekly Spanish-language version of L'Osservatore Romano with Calderón as its editor; it launched in 1969. In the course of covering the pope's weekly audiences was the first to use the term "catechesis" to refer to the pope's remarks, a term now widely adopted.

Calderón attended three general assemblies of the Latin American and Caribbean Bishops Conference (CELAM), accompanying Pope Paul to Medellín in 1968, working as a journalist in Puebla in 1979, and accompanying Pope John Paul to Santo Domingo in 1992. By the last of these he had become the pope's confidante and counselor on Latin American Church affairs.

On 26 November 1988, Pope John Paul II appointed vice president of the Pontifical Commission for Latin America, and he was assigned as a bishop the titular see of Thagora on 3 December. The Commission was an agency within the Congregation for Bishops that coordinated Vatican policy with the bishops conferences of Latin America. Because the prefect of the Congregation for Bishops was ex officio president of the Commission, Calderón as vice president was the most senior official dedicated to the Commission's work. He received his episcopal ordination on 6 January 1989 in the Basilica of St. Peter from Pope John Paul. Calderón accompanied Pope John Paul on all his trips to Latin America both before and after joining the Commission. He also attended the Synod of Bishops on America in 1997.

On 24 June 2003, the Spanish government presented him with the grand cross of the Order of Isabella the Catholic.

On 4 October 2003, Pope John Paul II accepted his resignation which he had submitted as required upon reaching the age of 75.

He died of side effects of cancer after being hospitalized for several days in the Pio XI clinic in Rome on 4 February 2009. He was buried in the church of El Salvador in Plasencia, the church where his uncle was pastor for many years and where he had been baptized, confirmed, and ordained a priest.

Plasencia named him its "favorite son" in 2006 and marked his birthplace with a plaque in 2013.
