= Guzmán Carriquiry Lecour =

Uruguayan lawyer, journalist and academic (born 1944)

- Born: 20 May 1944
- Occupations: Professor, lawyer, journalist, culturologist, university teacher, social scientist

Guzmán Carriquiry Lecour (born 20 May 1944) is a Uruguayan lawyer, journalist and activist on behalf of Roman Catholic causes in Latin America. In his 50-year career in the Roman Curia, he was one of the few laypersons in the upper ranks. For his last eight years, he was the highest ranking official of the Pontifical Commission for Latin America. After retiring from the Curia in 2019, he became Uruguay's ambassador to the Holy See in 2021.

== Biography ==
=== Early career ===
Guzmán Carriquiry Lecour was born in Montevideo on 20 May 1944. He studied at the University of the Republic in Montevideo where he received his doctorate in law and social sciences. He led the student organization of the Catholic University of Uruguay, the Association of Catholic Students and Professionals, and helped it expand throughout Latin America. He was director of the Center for Social Communications of the Bishops Conference of Uruguay.

=== Pontifical Council for the Laity ===
On 1 December 1971, he began his service in the Roman Curia. On 11 February 1977, Pope Paul VI appointed him office head of the Pontifical Council for the Laity, the first layperson to occupy that high a position in the Curia. On 12 September 1991, Pope John Paul II appointed him undersecretary of that body, again, the first layperson of that rank.

He participated as an expert "auditor" in meetings of the Synod of Bishops in 1974, 1980, 1987, and 1997. He had a leading role in official delegations of the Holy See attending United Nations conferences, as well as dozens of conferences of international Catholic organizations; he participated as an expert in the conferences of the Episcopal Conference of Latin America (CELAM) in Puebla in 1979 and Santo Domingo in 1992. He was responsible for organizing papal encounters with participants in World Youth Day for more than two decades.

=== Commission for Latin America ===
When faced with vacancies in the two highest positions (Note: The prefect of the Congregation for Bishops is president ex officio of the Commission.) in the Pontifical Commission for Latin America–vice president and secretary–Pope Benedict named Carriquiry its secretary on 14 May 2011 Carriquiry's appointment as secretary of the Commission, a position until then held by a priest, and particularly in the absence of a vice president, who by law needed to be a bishop, was deemed "unprecedented". The vice president's position was never filled. Pope Francis in turn confirmed Carriquiry as secretary in January 2014. and on 2 May of that year appointed him the Commission's "secretary with responsibility for the vice presidency", a unique designation.

Among the many conferences where he represented the Holy See, he participated as an expert in the CELAM conference in Aparecida in 2007. He later described Aparecida as the event that saw a seamless transition from Benedict XVI to his successor: "Pope Benedict inaugurates and gives the basic orientation of Aparecida, Bergoglio takes up everything together with the bishops and brings it to completion, giving it that consistency, that profile of Latin American ecclesial self-awareness". He described Pope Francis' encyclical Evangelii gaudium as the evolution in universal terms of what the Aparecida conference's statement meant for the Church in Latin America.

Carriquiry retired after eight years as secretary of the Commission in April 2019, a few weeks before his 75th birthday.

Throughout his Curial career he held a variety of teaching appointments at several pontifical universities in Rome, at secular institutions such as Sapienza University of Rome and University of Rome Tor Vergata, and others including the University of Rome "S. Pío V", the Faculty Theology of the University of Lugano, the Pontifical Catholic University of Chile, the Saint Thomas Aquinas University in Argentina, and many others.

== Diplomat ==
On 14 July 2020, Francisco Bustillo, Uruguay's foreign minister, announced Carriquiry's appointment as Uruguay's ambassador to the Holy See. On 9 January 2021, he presented his credentials to Pope Francis.

== Private life ==
Carriquiry is married to Lídice Gómez Mango with whom he has four children and, as of 2020, eight grandchildren. She was born in Montevideo and taught Spanish language and literature at the La Sapienza University of Rome. (Note: Her works on language and cultural encounter include L'incontro di lingue nel «nuovo mondo», an account of how "missionaries saved and developed many indigenous languages but only the most rooted and extensive managed to survive". It considers the significance of this linguistic relationship for a respectful integration of the cultures of a common Latin American homeland.) Pope Francis presided at a Mass in St. Peter's Basilica marking their 50th wedding anniversary; Cardinal Marc Ouellet delivered the homily.

== Honors ==
- "Comendatore" of the Italian Republic (1992)
- "Cavaliere di Gran Croce dell'Ordine di San Gregorio Magno (Vatican, 1994)
- "Grand Officer" of the Bernardo O'Higgings Order (Chile, 1999)
- "Great Officer of the Order of May of Merit (Argentina, 2001)
- La Universidad Católica del Uruguay la "gran Medalla d'honores"
- Honorary doctorates
  - Saint Thomas Aquinas University (Argentina, 2008)
  - Pontifical Catholic University of Argentina

== Selected writings ==
Carriquiry has published numerous books, magazine articles and conferences, particularly on the topics of the social doctrine of the Church, the history of Latin America, its culture and human rights issues.

- Carriquiry, Guzmán (2005). Una apuesta por America Latina [Betting on Latin America]. ISBN 9500726564. with an introduction by Jorge Bergoglio, archbishop of Buenos Aires, later Pope Francis
- El bicentenario de la independencia de los países latinoamericanos. Ayer y hoy (in Spanish). Encuentro. 2012. ISBN 978-8499209968.
- Globalización e identidad católica de América Latina (in Spanish). Plaza y Janés. 2002. ISBN 9681105559.
