= Baños de Río Tobía =

- Municipality
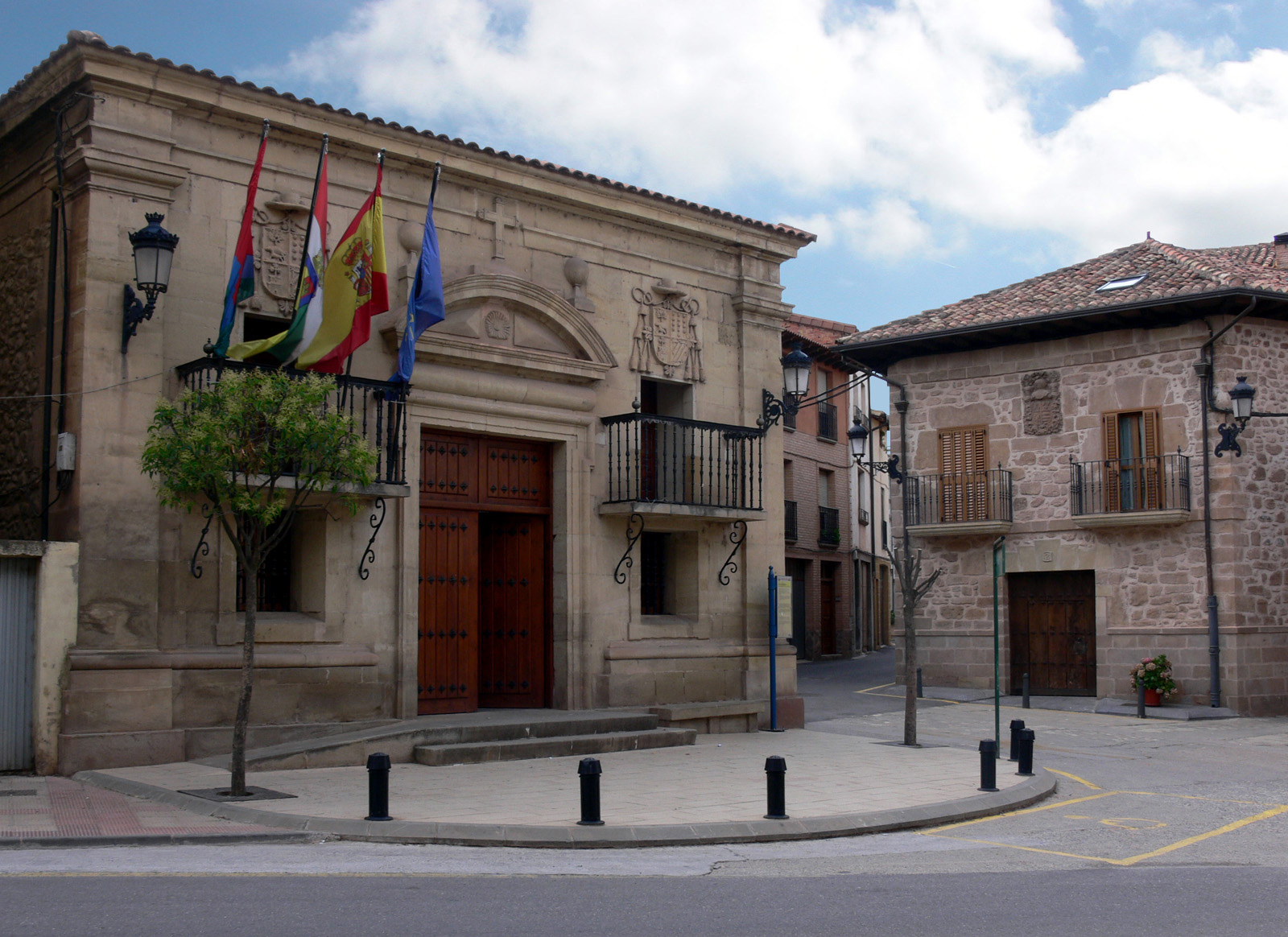
- Town Hall of Baños de Río Tobía

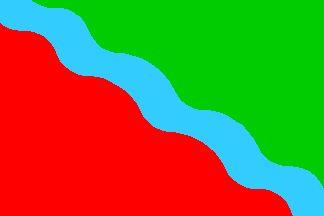
- Flag Coat of arms

- Location within La Rioja, Spain Location within Spain
- Coordinates: 42°20′6″N 2°45′39″W
- Country: Spain
- Autonomous community: La Rioja
- Comarca: Anguiano

Government
  - Mayor: David Villoslada (PSOE)

Area
  - Land: 17.59 km^{2} (6.79 sq mi)
- Elevation: 574 m (1,883 ft)

Population (2025-01-01)
  - Total: 1,589
  - Density: 90.96/km^{2} (235.6/sq mi)
- Demonym: Bañejos
- Time zone: UTC+1 (CET)
  - Summer (DST): UTC+2 (CEST)
- Postal code: 26320
- Website: Official website

Baños de Río Tobía is a village of La Rioja, in Spain. Located near the Najerilla river, in 2021 it had a population of 1,583 inhabitants. Its Chorizo, wood and plywood industry is notable.

== Places of interest ==
- Town Hall: 16th century.
- Salazar´s Palace: 17th century.
- Church of Saint Pelagius: 16th century.
- Hermitage of the Rosary: 17th century.
- Hermitage of the Virgin of Los Parrales. South of the town center.
Places of interest in Baños de Río Tobía

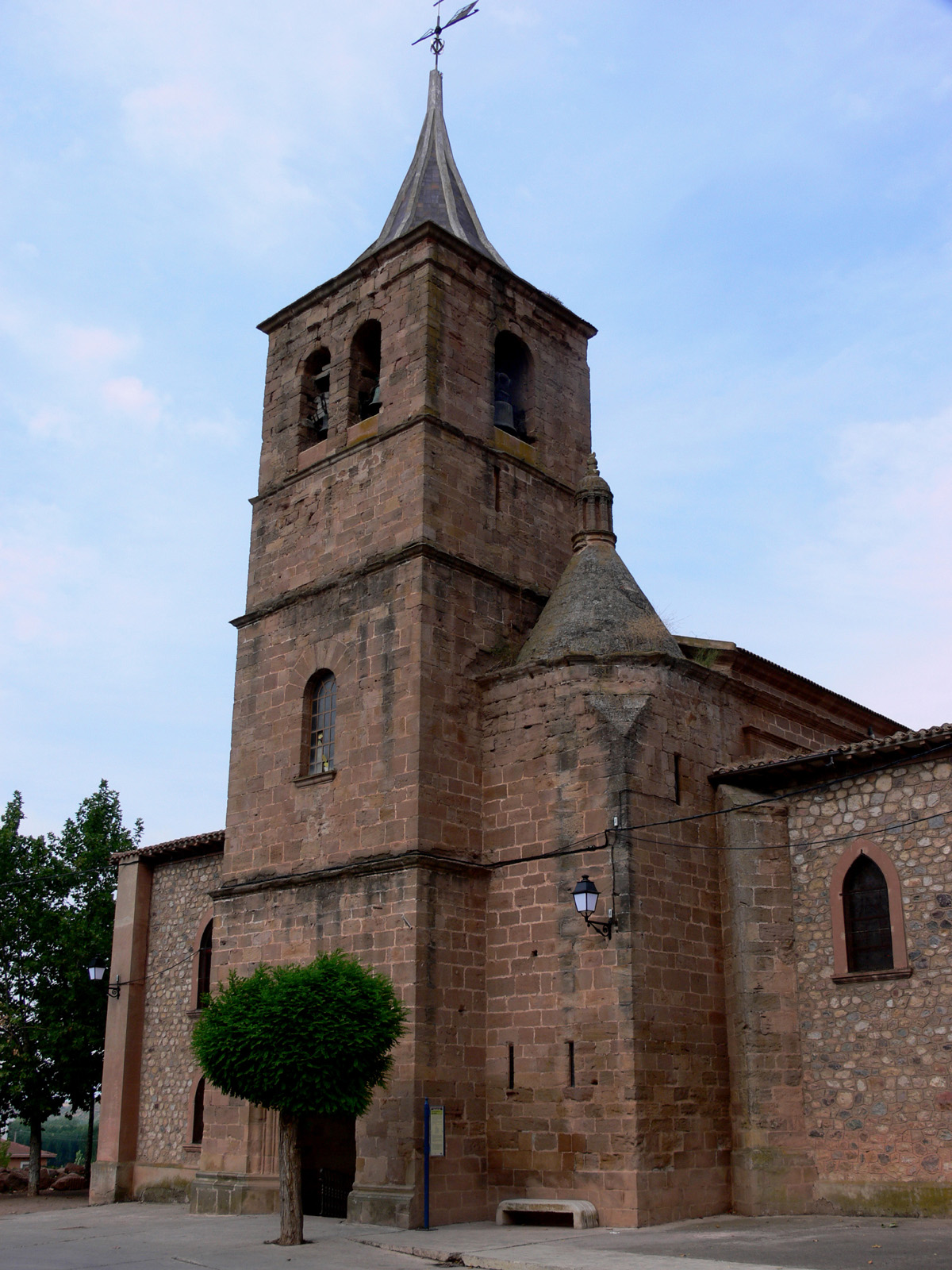
Church of Saint Pelagius.

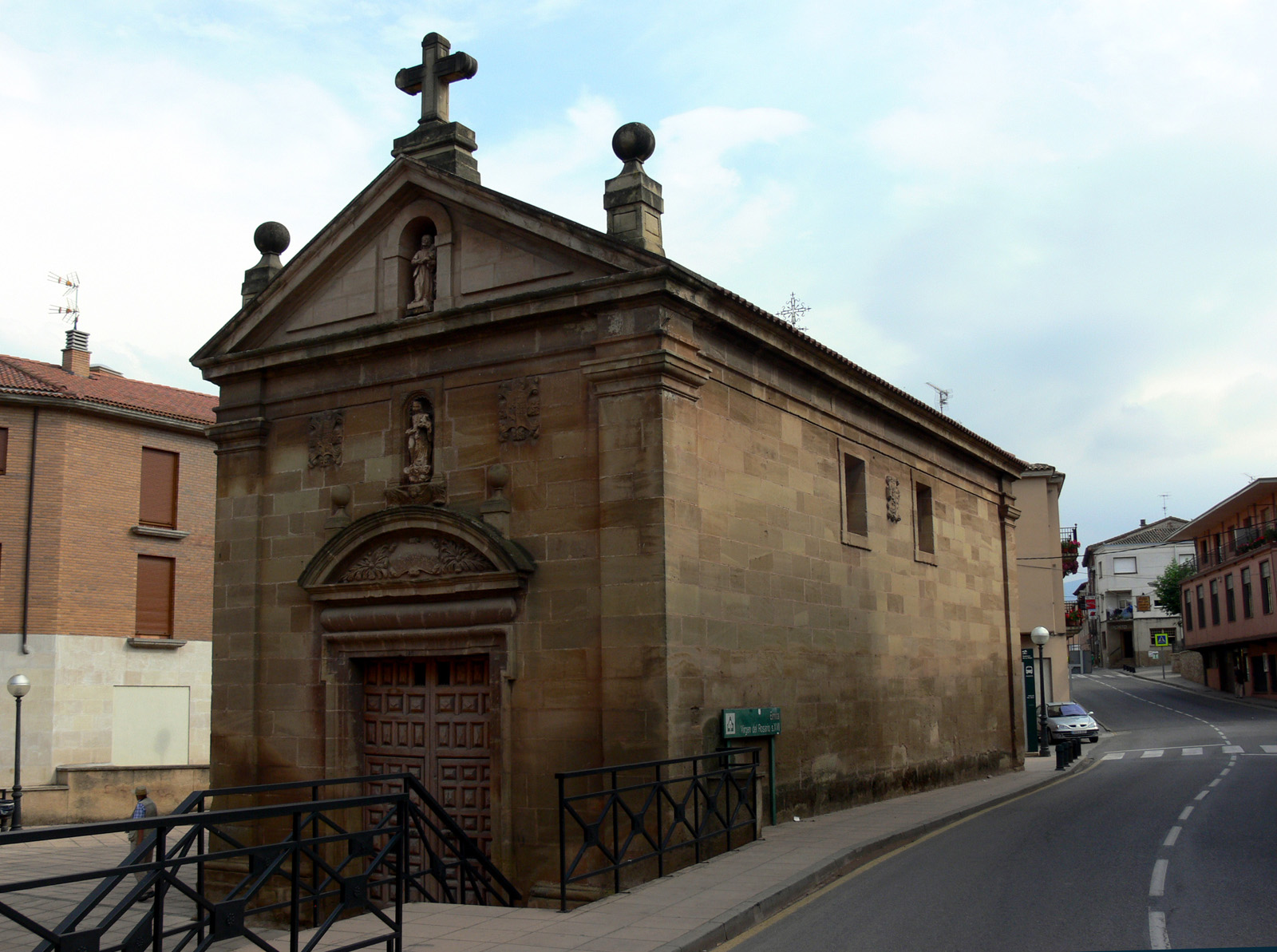
Hermitage of the Rosary.

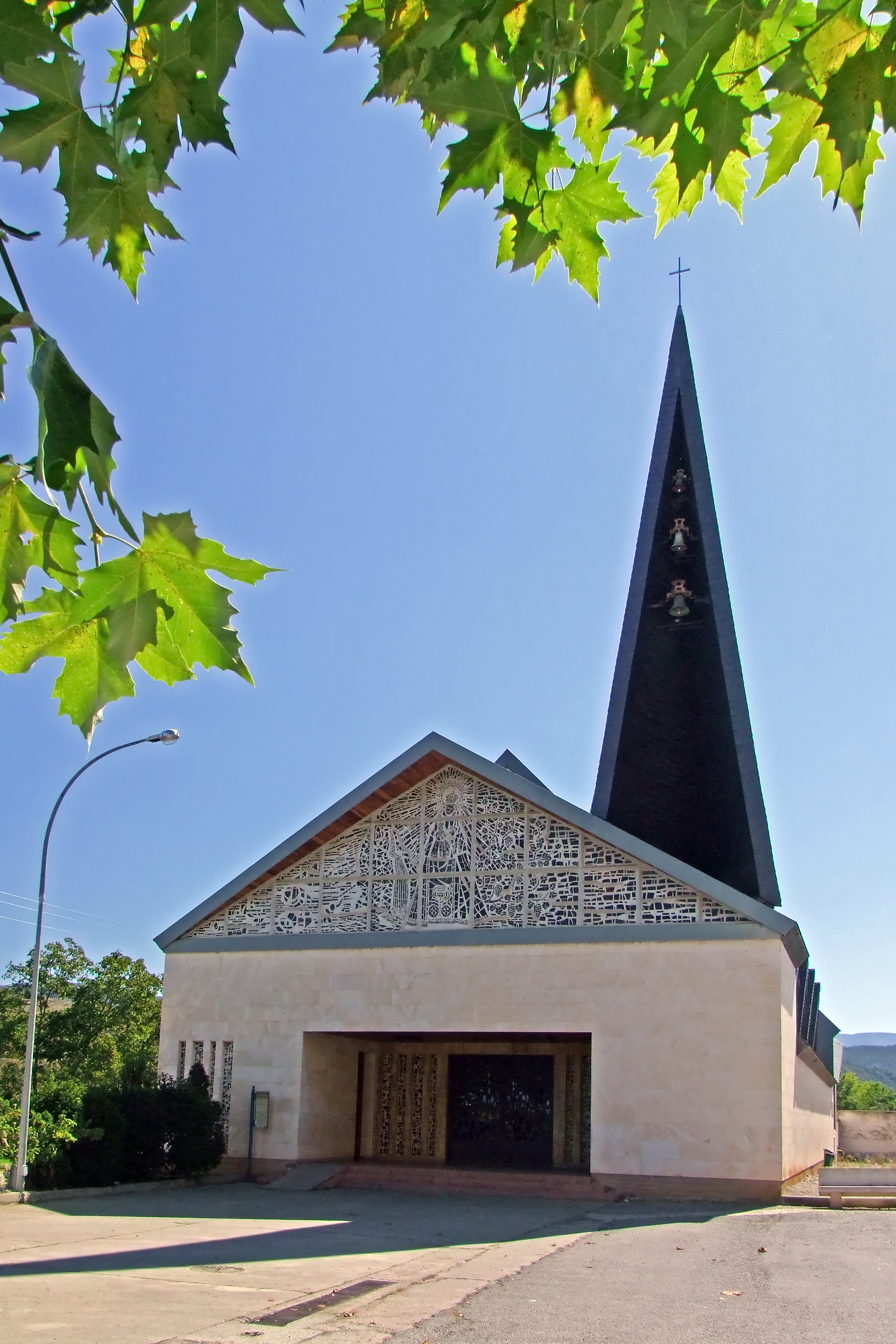
Hermitage of the Virgin of Los Parrales.

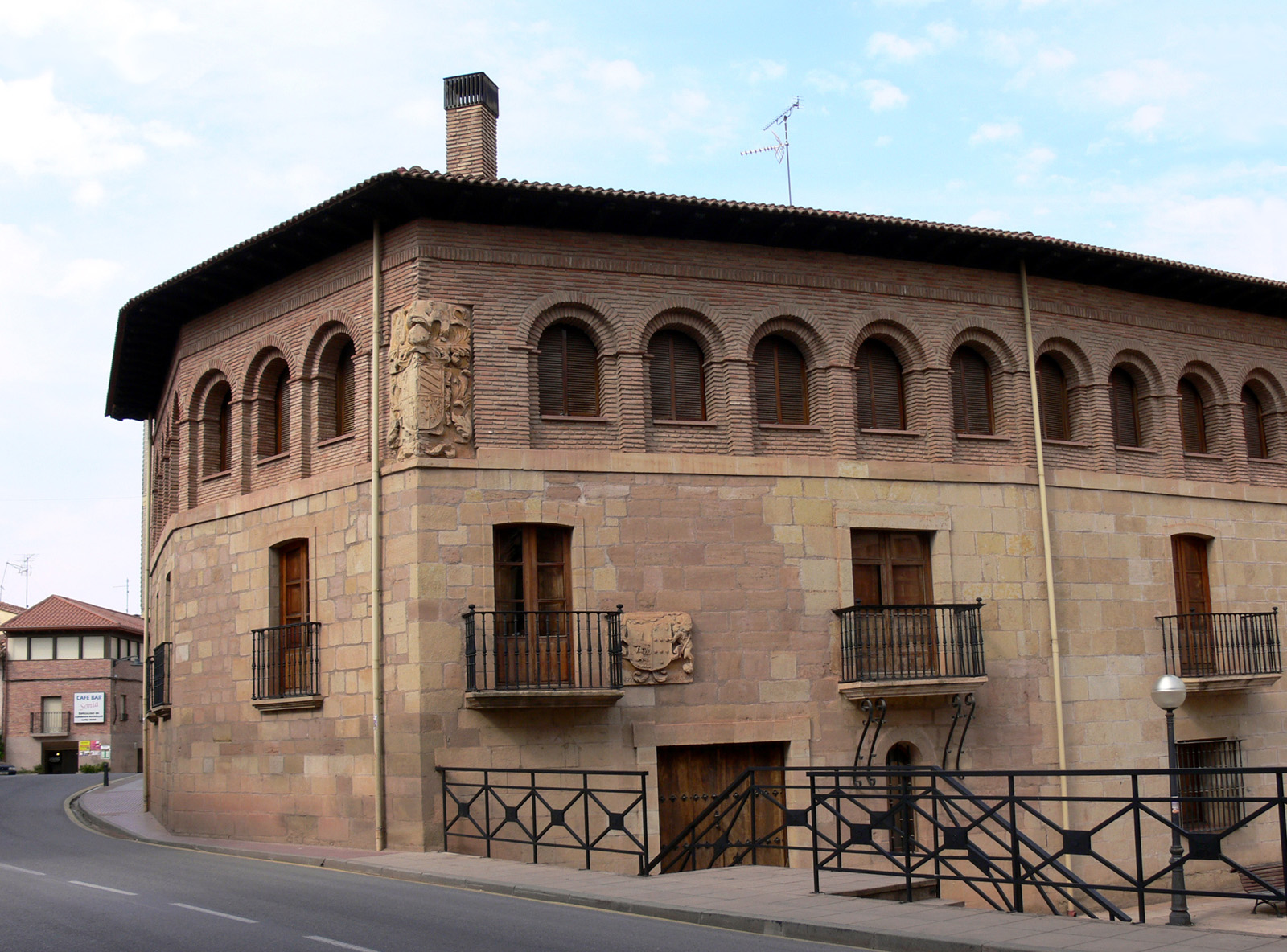
Salazar Palace.

== Feasts and festivals ==
Its main festivals are held from September 20 to 24, in honor of San Mateo and La Virgen de Los Parrales. On the Sunday before September 21, the Chorizo Festival is celebrated, during which chorizo is distributed among the thousands of attendees and the pig is slaughtered in its traditional way. In February, the "quintos" celebrate their party.

== Mayors ==
List of mayors since the democratic elections of 1979
Term	Mayor	Political party
1979–1983	Simón García Ceña	Independent
1983–1987	Juan José Altuzarra Arenzana	Independent
1987–1991	Juan José Altuzarra Arenzana	UCD
1991–1995	Juan José Altuzarra Arenzana	UCD
1995–1999	Esteban Ignacio Martínez Cornejo	PP
1999–2003	Esteban Ignacio Martínez Cornejo	PP
2003–2007	Jesús Clemente García González	PSOE
2007–2011	Jesús Clemente García González	PSOE
2011–2015	Fulgencio Francisco Fernández Pablo	PP
2015–2019	David Villoslada García	PSOE
2019–2023	David Villoslada García	PSOE
2023–	n/d	n/d

== Notable people ==
- Juan Jose Garcia Failde judge of the Roman Rota
- Eduardo Martínez Somalo (1927–2021): Cardinal of the Roman Catholic Church and Camerlengo of the Pope until 2007.
- Abel San Martín "Barberito I" (1927–1980): Pelotari Spanish champion in the individual category.
- Domingo Salazar (1525–1594): Archbishop de Manila.
- Benito Ignacio de Salazar (1615–1692) Bishop of Barcelona and president of the General Deputation of Catalonia between (1689–1692).

== Sports ==
Baños de Río Tobía has a soccer team, the Club Deportivo Bañuelos, founded in 1982, this club competes in Regional Preferente de Rioja. They dress in full red, with white details. The CD Bañuelos played 2 seasons in the Tercera División.

Annually, on the last Saturday of April, there is a night walk of about 63 km (39 miles) that goes from Logroño to the Monastery of Nuestra Señora de Valvanera, this night walk is known as La Valvanerada. The town collaborates in its organization by distributing supplies with a chocolate bar and carrying out controls. An amateur Mano pelota championship takes place during the summer, bringing together numerous competitors from different categories. "The day of the bicycle" is another sports activity, organized in June, a march takes place around the town, attended by a good part of its inhabitants.
