= Thagora =

Ancient city in Algeria

- Location within Algeria
- 36°10′N 8°02′E
- Location: Algeria

Thagora was a Carthaginian and Roman town at what is now Taoura, Algeria.

== Name ==
The Punic form of its name was tgrn (𐤕𐤂𐤓𐤍). The Tabula Peutingeriana calls it Thacora.

== History ==
Thagora was an inland trading post controlled by Carthage. It was about 64 kilometers (40 mi) southeast of Hippo Regius. It minted bronze coins with a bearded head obverse and a prancing horse beneath a star reverse.

Under the Romans, it formed part of the province of Numidia.

== Religion ==
Thagora was a Christian bishopric. The names of three of its diocesan bishops are known. It fell into abeyance following the Islamic conquest of the Maghreb but was revived by the Roman Catholic Church as a titular see.

=== List of bishops ===
- Xanthippus, mentioned by Augustine of Hippo in 401
- Postumianus, who participated in the Conference of Carthage (411)
- Timotheus, twentieth in the list of the Catholic bishops whom Hunneric summoned to Carthage in 484 and then exiled.
- John Baptist Cahill (1900)
- Alexandre Piquemal (1909–1920)
- Miguel de los Santos Díaz y Gómara (1920–1924)
- Jozef Cársky (1925–1962)
- Carlo Livraghi (1962–1975)
- Eduardo Martínez Somalo (1975–1988)
- Cipriano Calderón Polo (1988–2009)
- Giuseppe Marciante (2009–)
- Koen Vanhoutte (2018-)
