= TIBER =

TIBER (Threat Intelligence Based Ethical Red Teaming) is a standard developed by the European Central Bank for Red Teaming. It can be adopted by member states of the European Union.

== See also ==
- ENISA
