= Pontifical Council for the Laity =

Roman Catholic organization (1967–2016)

The Pontifical Council for the Laity was a pontifical council of the Roman Catholic Curia from 1967 to 2016. It had the responsibility of assisting the Pope in his dealings with the laity in lay ecclesial movements or individually, and their contributions to the Church. Its last Cardinal President from 4 October 2003 to 31 August 2016 was Cardinal Stanisław Ryłko. Its undersecretary from 1967 to 1976 was Professor Rosemary Goldie, the first woman to be the Undersecretary of a Pontifical Council and the highest-ranking woman in the Roman Curia at the time. Another layman, Professor Guzmán Carriquiry Lecour, was undersecretary from 1991 to 2011.

The Pontifical Council for the Laity had its foundation in Vatican II's Apostolicam Actuositatem. The council was created in January 1967 by Pope Paul VI's motu proprio Catholicam Christi Ecclesiam. In December 1976, the council was included as a permanent fixture of the Roman Curia. In September 2016, its functions were shifted to the new Dicastery for the Laity, Family and Life.

== Presidents of the Pontifical Council for the Laity ==
- Cardinal Maurice Roy (6 Jan 1967 – 16 Dec 1976)
- Cardinal Opilio Rossi (10 Dec 1976 – 8 Apr 1984)
- Cardinal Eduardo Francisco Pironio (8 Apr 1984 – 20 Aug 1996)
- Cardinal James Stafford (20 Aug 1996 – 4 Oct 2003)
- Cardinal Stanisław Ryłko (4 Oct 2003 – 1 Sept 2016)
