= Pontifical Commission for Latin America =

Department of the Roman Curia

The Pontifical Commission for Latin America (Italian: Pontificia commissione per l'America Latina, Latin: Pontificia commissio pro America Latina) is a department of the Roman Curia that since 1958 has been charged with providing assistance to and examining matters pertaining to the Catholic Church in Latin America. The Commission operates under the auspices of the Dicastery for Bishops (formerly the Congregation for Bishops and before that the Sacred Consistorial Congregation) and for most of its history the prefect of that body has been president of the Commission.

Robert Francis Prevost was president of the Commission from April 12, 2023, until his election as Pope Leo XIV on May 8, 2025. There are two secretaries, both laypersons: Rodrigo Guerra López and Emilce Cuda, appointed in July 2021 and February 2022, respectively. When appointed, Guerra was the only layperson with the rank of secretary in the Curia; the only layman with a higher rank was Paolo Ruffini, prefect of the Dicastery for Communications. Cuda became one of the few women in senior positions in the Curia.

== History and role ==
Pope Pius XII established the Commission as an independent body within the Roman Curia on 19 April 1958. The initial impulse was to create a mechanism for the Church in Canada, the United States, and Europe to address the critical shortage of priests in Latin America. Pope Paul VI marked the Commission's fifth anniversary with a letter to the Commission's president Cardinal Carlo Confalonieri on 9 July 1963, an exhortation counseling continued collaboration that also expressed his concern about priests engaged in social action. (Note: Pope Paul wrote: "The mission of the Church is essentially religious, it is a communication of grace.... Hence the need to intensify pastoral action proper, to choose the most suitable means to broaden its range of influence, so that it reaches all strata of society. The deeper this action becomes, the more intense will be the reflected benefits that it will not fail to make felt in other sectors of human activity as well. Indeed, if the mission of the Church is neither directly political, nor social, nor economic, there will be nothing extraneous to the priest who has well understood the value and extent of his ministry, which is that of permeating everything with the spirit.") Pope Paul made the Commission part of the Congregation for Bishops on 30 November 1963. Pope Paul also created under the Commission a General Council of the Pontifical Commission for Latin America, composed of prelates representing the Episcopal Conference of Latin America (CELAM) and several European countries. This body was to name the Commission's president and represented an attempt by Rome to assert control over CELAM, especially its second general conference in 1968 in Medellín. In the words of one historian, the Commission was "a counterweight to CELAM, curtailing its possibilities.

Pope John Paul II reorganized it on 18 June 1988. He specified the Commission members, all papal appointees, to be the secretaries of the Curial departments especially interested along with two bishops representing CELAM and three diocesan prelates from Latin America, and detailed a larger group to meet annually to consider more important questions. His apostolic constitution Pastor Bonus promulgated on 28 June 1988 said that "The function of the Pontifical Commission for Latin America is to be available to the particular Churches in Latin America, by counsel and by action, taking a keen interest in the questions that affect the life and progress of those Churches; and especially to help the Churches themselves in the solution of those questions, or to be helpful to those dicasteries of the Curia that are involved by reason of their competence." It did not specify the number of members. It provided for a bishop to serve as vice president.

Since 5 June 2022, according to the apostolic constitution Praedicate evangelium, "Established within the Dicastery [for Bishops] is the Pontifical Commission for Latin America, which is responsible for studying questions regarding the life and growth of those particular Churches as a means of assisting the Dicasteries that deal with them by reason of their competence, and to help those Churches with advice and economic resources." It made no provision for a vice president.

== Leadership ==
- President: Filippo Iannone
- Secretaries: Emilce Cuda, Rodrigo Guerra López

Presidents

The office was not consistently filled by the prefect of the Congregation for Bishops until 1969.

- Marcello Mimmi (1958 – 6 March 1961)
  - Mimmi was both secretary of the Sacred Consistorial Congregation, predecessor of the Dicastery for Bishops, and president of this Commission.
- Carlo Confalonieri (14 March 1961 – 15 August 1967)
  - While president of the Commission, Confalonieri was secretary of the Sacred Consistorial Congregation until 1965, then while pro-prefect of the same body under its new name, the Congregation for Bishops, but ending when he became a cardinal and prefect of that congregation.
- Antonio Samoré (25 September 1967 – 1969)
  - Samoré was a secretary of the Congregation for Extraordinary Ecclesiastical Affairs and vice president of this Commission, the latter with neither predecessor nor successor, when he became president; he was made a cardinal and prefect of the Congregation for the Sacraments while continuing for a time as president of this Commission.
- Carlo Confalonieri (1969 – 25 February 1973)
  - Confalonieri was again president while prefect of the Congregation for Bishops, the same combination of roles filled by all his successors.
- Sebastiano Baggio (26 February 1973 – 8 April 1984)
- Bernardin Gantin (8 April 1984 – 25 June 1998)
- Lucas Moreira Neves, OP (25 June 1998 – 16 September 2000)
- Giovanni Battista Re (16 September 2000 - 30 June 2010)
- Marc Ouellet (30 June 2010 – 30 January 2023)
- Robert Francis Prevost (12 April 2023 – 8 May 2025) (became Pope Leo XIV on 8 May 2025)
- Filippo Iannone (26 September 2025 – Present.)

Vice presidents

Pope John Paul established the role of vice president in 1988 and specified it be filled by a bishop. When the vice president's position became vacant on 13 May 2011, Guzmán Carriquiry, a layman, was named secretary the next day (Note: Carriquiry had been named the first Curial department head by Pope Paul and the first lay undersecretary by Pope John Paul. His appointment as secretary of the Commission, particularly in the absence of a bishop vice president, was deemed "unprecedented".) and the vice president's position remained vacant. On 2 May 2014 Pope Francis appointed Carriquiry "secretary charged with the vice presidency". Carriquiry left the Commission on 29 April 2019. Upon the appointment of a new secretary in July 2021, the vice president's position went unmentioned and the post was not included in Pope Francis' reorganization of the Curia in 2022.

- Cipriano Calderón Polo (26 November 1988 – 4 October 2003)
- Luis Robles Díaz (4 October 2003 – 7 April 2007)
- José Ruiz Arenas (31 May 2007 – 13 May 2011)

== See also ==
- Pontifical Commission
