= Marc Ouellet =

Canadian Catholic cardinal (born 1944)

His Eminence Marc Ouellet PSS
- Prefect Emeritus of the Dicastery for Bishops; President Emeritus of the Pontifical Commission for Latin America
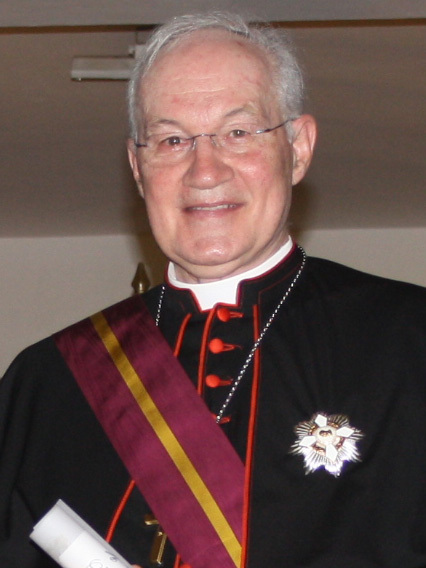
- Ouellet in 2012
- Appointed: 30 June 2010
- Term ended: 30 January 2023
- Predecessor: Giovanni Battista Re
- Successor: Robert Francis Prevost
- Other post: Cardinal-Bishop of Santa Maria in Traspontina (2003–)
- Previous posts: Secretary of the Pontifical Council for Promoting Christian Unity (2001–2003); Titular Archbishop of Acropolis (2001–2003); Archbishop of Quebec (2003-2010)

Orders
- Ordination: 25 May 1968 by Gaston Hains
- Consecration: 19 March 2001 by Pope John Paul II
- Created cardinal: 21 October 2003 by Pope John Paul II
- Rank: Cardinal Bishop

Personal details
- Born: Marc Armand Ouellet; 8 June 1944 (age 82) La Motte, Quebec, Canada
- Denomination: Catholic
- Parents: Pierre Ouellet and Graziella Michaud
- Motto: Ut unum sint (Latin for 'That they may be one')
- Coat of arms

Marc Armand Ouellet PSS (French pronunciation: [maʁk welɛ]; born 8 June 1944) is a Canadian Catholic prelate who served as prefect of the Dicastery for Bishops and president of the Pontifical Commission for Latin America from 2010 to 2023. He is a member of the Sulpicians.

Ouellet served as Archbishop of Quebec and Primate of Canada from 2003 to 2010. He was made a cardinal by Pope John Paul II on 21 October 2003 and was considered a possible candidate for election to the papacy in 2005, 2013 and 2025.

He spent his early career as a priest from 1972 to 2001 developing his credentials as a theologian and working as a seminary teacher and administrator in Canada, Colombia, and Rome. He also served briefly in the Roman Curia from 2001 to 2003.

== Early life ==
Ouellet was born on 8 June 1944 into a Catholic family of eight children in La Motte, Quebec, the third son of Pierre Ouellet (1919-1988) and Graziella Michaud (1922-2015). His father, Pierre, was a farmer who was self-taught, and later director-general of the area's school board. Ouellet attended Mass at Église Saint-Luc (now a community centre) regularly with his family. Ouellet later described his family as religious but not very devout. His childhood interests included reading, ice hockey, hunting partridge, and fishing. One of his summer jobs was fighting forest fires. While recovering from a hockey injury at age 17, he read Thérèse of Lisieux and started a more focused search for meaning. Although his father was reluctant to see his son become a priest, Ouellet while still a teenager informed him he had made a firm decision.

== Career ==
He studied at the Major Seminary of Montreal from 1964 to 1969, earning a licentiate in theology. He was ordained a priest on 25 May 1968. He became vicar at the Saint-Sauveur church in nearby Val-d'Or for 1968–70 and then began years of alternating seminary work with further studies. He taught philosophy in 1970–71 at the Major Seminary of Bogotá, Colombia, which was run by the Sulpicians. He joined the Sulpicians in 1972. At the Pontifical University of St. Thomas Aquinas Angelicum in Rome, he earned a license in philosophy in 1974. He returned to teaching at the Major Seminary of Manizales, Colombia, joining in its management as well and then performed those same roles at the Grand Séminaire de Montréal beginning in 1976. He studied dogmatic theology at the Pontifical Gregorian University beginning in 1978, earning a doctorate in 1983 with a thesis on Hans Urs von Balthasar.

Returning to Colombia in 1983, he taught at the Major Seminary of Cali and then served as rector of the Major Seminary of Manzinales from 1984 to 1989. He became rector of the Grand Séminaire de Montréal in 1990, (Note: An investigation undertaken in 2020 concluded that Ouellet had failed while rector of the Grand Séminaire de Montréal to take seriously and investigate reports of inappropriate behavior, at times involving minors and sexual in nature, lodged against Brian Boucher, who was then seeking ordination; Boucher pleaded guilty in 2019 to charges of sex abuse.) then rector of St. Joseph's Seminary in Edmonton in 1994. From 1996 to 2002 he held the chair in dogmatic theology at the John Paul II Institute for the Study of Marriage and the Family, then part of the Pontifical Lateran University.

In 1990 Ouellet joined the editorial board of the North American edition of Communio, a journal of Catholic theology established after the Second Vatican Council by "conservatives disappointed with some of the excesses that followed the Second Vatican Council". In 1995 he was appointed a consultor of the Congregation for the Clergy and in 1999 for the Congregation for Divine Worship and the Discipline of the Sacraments. He became known during his teaching years as "a devotee of Swiss Catholic theologican Hans Urs von Balthasar, a darling of the Catholic right", whose work was the subject of Ouellet's 1983 doctoral thesis. (Note: Ouellet's thesis was L'existence comme mission. L'anthropologie théologique de Hans Urs von Balthasar. It was published in part as L'anthropologie théologique de Hans Urs von Balthasar the same year.)

Ouellet was named titular archbishop of Agropoli and secretary of the Pontifical Council for Promoting Christian Unity on 3 March 2001. Pope John Paul II consecrated him a bishop on 19 March 2001 in St. Peter's Basilica. On 12 June 2001 he was named a consultor to the Congregation for the Doctrine of the Faith.

=== Archbishop of Quebec ===
On 15 November 2002, Pope John Paul II appointed him Archbishop of Quebec. He was installed there on 26 January 2003. In that post he became a spokesman for the Catholic Church on all the public policy questions of the day. On 12 July 2005, Ouellet testified on behalf of the Canadian Conference of Catholic Bishops before the Senate of Canada. He urged senators to vote against legalising same-sex marriage, referring to it as a "pseudo-marriage, a fiction".

On 21 November 2007, in a letter published in Quebec French-language newspapers, Ouellet apologized for what he described as past "errors" of the Roman Catholic Church in Quebec. Among the errors he wrote about were attitudes, prior to 1960, which promoted "anti-Semitism, racism, indifference to First Nations and discrimination against women and homosexuals." (Note: The text of Ouellet's letter is available in the original French and in an English translation.)

In October 2008, Ouellet was sharply critical of a required course newly instituted in Quebec's schools Ethics and religious culture, established as part of a program to eliminate sectarianism from public education. (Note: Before 2008, students selected from three courses, Catholic religious and moral education, Protestant religious and moral education, or non-religious moral education.) He doubted that teachers could provide instruction with "complete neutrality" to "produce a new little Quebecer, pluralist, expert in interreligious relations and critical of all beliefs". He advocated the protection of Quebec's religious heritage, which he described as "a force for social integration much more effective than the abstract knowledge of a few simple notions about six or several religions".

At a rally against abortion in 2010, Ouellet said that abortions should not be performed in cases of pregnancy from rape, saying "But there is already a victim. Must there be another one?"

In May 2010 Ouellet stood by his comments that abortion is unjustifiable, even in the case of rape, and urged the federal government to help pregnant women keep their child. He said that "Governments are funding clinics for abortion. I would like equity for organizations that are defending also life. If we have equity in funding those instances to help women I think we would make lots of progress in Canada".

Having earlier applauded prime minister Stephen Harper's government for its stance against funding abortions in the developing world, he added: "If they do not want to fund abortion abroad and they do not bring at home more help to women to keep their child, I think they are incoherent".

=== Cardinal ===
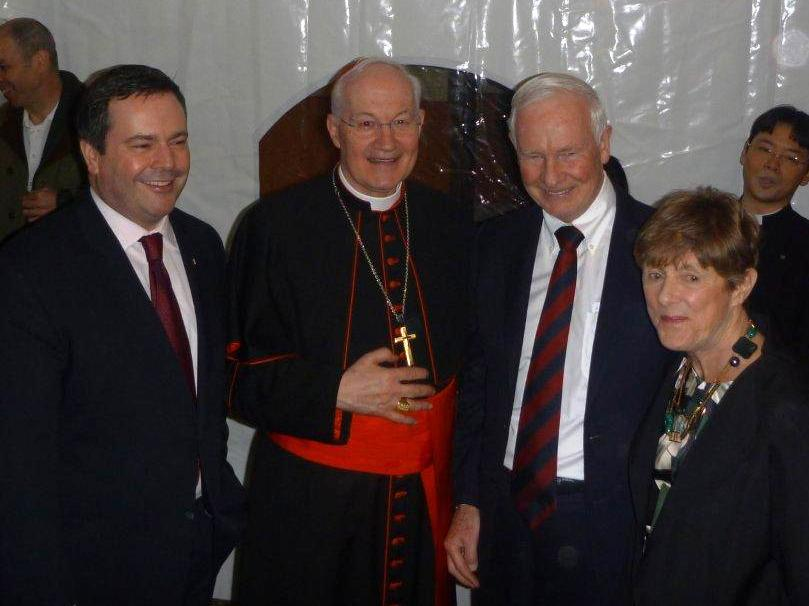
Ouellet with David Johnston, and Jason Kenney the night before the papal inauguration of Pope Francis

On 21 October 2003, at the first consistory for creating cardinals following Ouellet's appointment to Quebec, Pope John Paul II made him a cardinal, assigning him as a cardinal priest to Santa Maria in Traspontina.

He was a cardinal elector in the 2005 papal conclave. Anticipating that gathering, John L. Allen writing in the National Catholic Reporter placed Ouellet among twenty candidates for the papacy. He noted Ouellet's attachment to traditional liturgical practices and a certain disaffection with developments since the Second Vatican Council, but said that "people who have worked with Ouellet describe him as friendly, humble and flexible, and a man not so captive to his own intellectual system as to make him incapable of listening to others." One account of the balloting said that Ouellet had supported Cardinal Joseph Ratzinger, who became Pope Benedict XVI.

On 24 November 2003, Pope John Paul II named him a member of the Congregation for Divine Worship and the Discipline of the Sacraments and a consultor for the Pontifical Commission for Latin America. Pope Benedict XVI included him among the papal appointees to the 2005 Synod of Bishops on the Eucharist, one of eight members of the Council of Cardinals for the Study of Organizational and Economic Affairs of the Holy See on 3 February 2007, a member of the Congregation for Catholic Education on 24 May 2007, a member of the Pontifical Council for Culture on 8 February 2008, and a member of the Pontifical Commission for Latin America on 8 October 2009.

Ouellet was appointed relator-general (recording secretary) of the Synod of Bishops that met in October 2008 to consider "The Word of God in the Life and Mission of the Church". In his opening-day address he advocated for Biblical exegesis motivated by faith, not driven by the "superficial characteristics" explored in linguistic and archeological scholarship. He also called for reading scripture in the light of Church teaching; he lamented the "often unhealthy tension between university theology and the ecclesiastical magisterium."

In June 2011 Ouellet addressed speculation about his odds in a potential conclave, saying that, for him, being pope "would be a nightmare". Ouellet said that seeing Pope Benedict's workload at close range makes the prospect of the papacy "not very enviable". He added: "It is a crushing responsibility. It's the kind of thing you don't campaign for."

Ouellet participated as an elector again in the 2013 conclave, which elected Benedict XVI's successor, Pope Francis. Ouellet was among those receiving the most votes in the first two ballots. As the electors gathered for this conclave, he helped arrange for Cardinal Keith O'Brien to withdraw from participation amid multiple accusations of sexual misconduct.

=== Roman Curia ===
On 30 June 2010, Pope Benedict named him prefect of the Congregation for Bishops and president of the Pontifical Commission for Latin America. (Note: Ouellet had been associated with the Commission for Latin America since being named a consultor in 2003 and a member in 2009.) Asked at the time to assess the sexual abuse scandal, Ouellet cited as contributing factors a culture of secrecy and psychological ignorance within the Church and the relaxation of sexual restraint in society on the whole and within the Church as a consequence of misinterpretations of the Second Vatican Council and a substitution of relativism for moral objectivism and rigorous adherence to the Church's moral doctrine.

After a few months managing the selection and appointment of bishops, he described his mission: "Today, especially in the context of our secularized societies, we need bishops who are the first evangelizers, and not mere administrators of dioceses, who are capable of proclaiming the Gospel, who are not only theologically faithful to the magisterium and the pope but are also capable of expounding and, if need be, of defending the faith publicly." He also cautioned that if a priest or a bishop aspires and maneuvers to be promoted to a prominent diocese, "it is better for him to stay where he is."

Addressing a conference on "Sacred Scripture in the Church" in February 2011, Ouellet reiterated his ideas on Biblical interpretation, adding the context of an increasingly secular European culture that no longer recognizes Christianity and the Bible as the source of its culture, but one tradition among many. He said: "A new raison d'etat imposes its law and tries to relegate the Christian roots of Europe to a secondary plane. It would seem that, in the name of secularism, the Bible must be relativised, to be dissolved in a religious pluralism and disappear as a normative cultural reference."

He was made a member of the Congregation for the Doctrine of the Faith on 16 October 2010. On 5 January 2011 he was appointed among the first members of the newly created Pontifical Council for the Promotion of the New Evangelisation. On 29 January 2011, Ouellet was appointed by Pope Benedict XVI as a member of Secretariat of State (second section). On 6 April 2011, Ouellet was named a member of the Pontifical Council for Legislative Texts and on 7 March 2012 a member of the Congregation for the Oriental Churches.

Pope Francis named him a member of the Congregation for Institutes of Consecrated Life on 29 March 2014 and of the Congregation for the Clergy on 9 June 2014.

Pope Francis raised him to the rank of Cardinal Bishop effective 28 June 2018. In September 2018, discussing the priestly sexual abuse crisis, Ouellet said "we will need more participation of women in the formation of priests, in teaching, in the discernment of candidates and their emotional balance". In October he told the Synod of Bishops on Young People that it was "possible and necessary to accelerate the processes of struggle against the 'machista' culture and clericalism, to develop respect for women and the recognition of their charisms as well as their equal integration in the life of society and the church".

Shortly before the October 2019 Synod of Bishops on the Amazon, which was expected to hear some bishops advocate for the ordination of married men to the priesthood, Ouellet published a book expressing his skepticism, Friends of the Bridegroom: For a Renewed Vision of Priestly Celibacy. He noted that rural communities of the region struggled to provide training even for catechists. During the synod he said that "Celibacy has an incomparable evangelizing power". He called for a "vocational culture" that would engage both laity and religious. In December of that year, Ouellet said that the proportion of priests who declined to serve as bishops had risen from one in ten to three in ten in the last decade.

Pope Francis accepted his resignation from his curial positions on 30 January 2023, though he continued to be accorded the title of prefect of the Dicastery for Bishops pending his successor's assumption of that office on 12 April 2023. (Note: See, for example, his audience with Pope Francis on 1 April 2023, where the Holy See Press Office identified him as "prefect of the Dicastery for Bishops".)

== Personal life ==
Ouellet is fluent in English, French, Spanish, Portuguese, Italian, Latin, and German.

=== Criticism of Scientology ===
Ouellet has criticized Scientology, stating "Scientology is something else. For me, this community is not a Church." He said "Our governments should inquire about what certain European countries have done with regard to this group and the problems it may raise, rather than blindly granting religious corporation status to such an organization."

=== Plagiarism accusation ===
Michael V. Dougherty accused Ouellet of plagiarizing from multiple sources, possibly by his alleged ghostwriter, Fr Thomas Rosica.

=== Accusation of sexual assault ===
On August 8, 2022, a class-action lawsuit against the Archdiocese of Quebec named Ouellet as the assailant of an unnamed woman (referred to as "F"), who accused the cleric of kissing her at a cocktail reception in 2008. "F" alleged that Ouellet massaged her shoulders and slid his hand down her back, touching her buttocks. No criminal charges were laid. The lawsuit says that "F" wrote to Pope Francis about Ouellet in January 2021. Ouellet has denied the sexual assault allegation, calling it "defamatory". In January 2023, the woman referred to as "F" revealed herself to be Paméla Groleau.

The Vatican began an internal preliminary investigation into her charge against Ouellet in February 2021, led by Jacques Servais, a Jesuit priest and theologian. On August 18, 2022, the Vatican dropped its investigation into Ouellet, after Pope Francis determined that there was not sufficient evidence to begin a canonical investigation.

In December 2022, Ouellet filed a defamation lawsuit in Quebec courts, arguing that he was falsely accused of sexual assault.

In August 2026, Justice Martin Castonguay declared that the accusations against Ouellet were not credible, and stated that she had behaved "recklessly or even maliciously" towards Ouellet. He condemned Groleau to pay $100,000 to Ouellet for defamation, a sum which Ouellet has promised to give to organizations fighting sexual violence against Canadian indigenous people.

== Distinctions ==
- Holy See: Order of the Holy Sepulchre

== Notes ==
Catholic Church titles
Preceded by Zenon Grocholewski	— TITULAR — Titular Bishop of Agropoli; 3 March 2001 – 15 November 2002	Succeeded by Pedro López Quintana
Preceded by Walter Kasper	Secretary of Pontifical Council for Promoting Christian Unity; 3 March 2001 – 15 November 2002	Succeeded by Brian Farrell
Preceded by Maurice Couture	Primate of Canada; Archbishop of Quebec; 15 November 2002 – 30 June 2010	Succeeded by Gérald Lacroix
Preceded by Gerald Emmett Carter	Cardinal Priest of Santa Maria in Traspontina; 21 October 2003 –	Succeeded by Himself as cardinal bishop
Preceded by Giovanni Battista Re	Prefect of the Congregation for Bishops; 30 June 2010 – 30 January 2023	Succeeded by Robert Francis Prevost
Preceded by Giovanni Battista Re	President of the Pontifical Commission for Latin America; 30 June 2010 – 30 January 2023	Succeeded by Robert Francis Prevost
Himself as cardinal priest	Cardinal Bishop of Santa Maria in Traspontina; 28 June 2018 –	Incumbent
