= Forum Novum =

Coordinates: 42°19′50″N 12°36′14″E

- Location within Lazio
- Type: Settlement
- Periods: Roman Republic
- Cultures: Ancient Rome
- Region: Lazio

Site notes
- Excavation dates: yes
- Archaeologists: Vincent Gaffney, Helen Patterson

Forum Novum or Fornovo (later also called Vescovìo) was a new Roman foundation which developed as a forum or market center during the Roman Republic period. By the early 1st century AD Forum Novum had been elevated to the status of municipium, appearing as such in Pliny's list of towns. It is located within today’s commune of Torri in Sabina in the province of Rieti.

Knowledge of the history of the centre comes largely from literary sources and the rich epigraphic evidence. Forum Novum seems to have functioned throughout the imperial period and a market was still being held at the center in the fourth century. Although urban life probably underwent a decline around this period, Forum Novum, later Vescovio, continued to act as a local and regional focus with the establishment of a bishopric in the fifth century, a role it maintained throughout the early medieval and medieval periods; it remains a titular see in the Catholic Church today.

Little systematic archaeological work has been carried out on the centre or its valley. Excavations carried out by the Soprintendenza Archeologica per il Lazio in the late 1970s and early 80s revealed the basilica, a temple complex, part of the forum and various associated buildings of uncertain function. The results have never been fully published.

== Recent work at Forum Novum ==
The current British School at Rome's project at Forum Novum began in 1997. The aim is to apply a series of approaches to the center in order to provide a detailed and systematic study. As such it provides a complement to the other urban studies being carried out as part of the Tiber Valley Project, in particular to the study of the larger scales of urban form currently being carried out by Simon Keay and Martin Millett.

The survey results from geophysical survey techniques have shown that the site does not seem to have had a dense settlement or population, and in fact the only buildings which seem to have been domestic were associated with the small tabernae. An urban villa was also found close to the centre and cannot be ignored in discussion of the site. As well as these buildings, the survey located the forum, baths complex and Amphitheatre. Some areas could not be surveyed with geophysics and so ground-penetrating radar was used to fill in the gaps.

Excavation was also carried out alongside the survey to give a fuller picture of the site.

The site does not seem to have been heavily populated, therefore, and can be interpreted as a focus for the rural population, which was monumentalized by some local elites, perhaps just the one family from the urban villa, trying to create a Roman settlement, but in order to understand the site more fully, a survey of the hinterland of Forum Novum would be appropriate.

Whether Forum Novum was the "norm" or an exception is only something which will be discovered with further surveying of the Tiber Valley.
