= Tiber Valley Project =

The British School at Rome’s Tiber Valley Project (1998–2002) studied the changing landscapes of the middle Tiber Valley as the hinterland of Rome through two millennia. The Tiber Valley Project was funded by the Leverhume Trust and involved twelve British universities and institutions as well as many Italian scholars.

== Research ==
The project drew on the vast amount of archaeological work carried out in this area to examine the impact of the growth, success and transformation of the city on the history of settlement, economy and society in the river valley from ca. 1000 BC to AD 1000. The wealth of surface survey evidence in particular provided a valuable resource for examining these themes. However, no study has ever attempted to incorporate the wide range of settlement and economic evidence available and the full potential of the data for understanding these processes has been largely undeveloped.

British fieldwork in this area goes back to the beginning of the 20th century with Thomas Ashby’s pioneering study of the Roman campagna. However it was the South Etruria survey, directed by John Ward Perkins’ in the 1950s to 70s, which represented a milestone in Italian and Mediterranean landscape archaeology and stimulated a series of field surveys and excavations by British and, in particular, Italian archaeologists in this area.

== Publishing ==
Tim Potter’s classic synthesis of the South Etruria survey, ‘The Changing landscape of South Etruria’ published in 1979, represented the first and only attempt to analyze developments in one part of this area through time. The first phase of the Tiber Valley project and the restudy of the South Etruria data led to a fundamental reassessment of our historical and archaeological approaches to the Tiber valley, allowing a new reading of the historical landscape and the changing relationship between Rome and its hinterland.

The final project monograph, by Helen Patterson, Robert Witcher and Helga Di Giuseppe, was published in 2020: "The Changing Landscapes of Rome's Northern Hinterland]: The British School at Rome's Tiber Valley Project" Since 2015, a consortium has been working to integrate the results of three large surveys in the hinterland of Rome, including the results of the Tiber Valley Project, as part of the Roman Hinterland Project.
