= List of dignitaries at the funeral of Pope Francis =

Map showing countries from which a national delegation was present at the funeral of Pope Francis

The funeral of Pope Francis on 26 April 2025 was attended by representatives from 142 out of 193 UN member states, along with the Republic of China, (Note: Also known as "Taiwan". The Holy See has had official diplomatic relations with the Republic of China (ROC) instead of the People's Republic of China (PRC) since the end of the Chinese Civil War. See also Political status of Taiwan.) Kosovo, (Note: The Republic of Kosovo, which declared independence from Serbia in 2008 and has attained partial international recognition, is not officially recognized by the Holy See. See also Political status of Kosovo.) Palestine and the Sovereign Military Order of Malta, including 63 heads of state and 26 heads of government. Following Francis's death five days prior, many foreign leaders confirmed their forthcoming attendance at his Requiem Mass, some as early as on the day of his death. Several cardinal electors in the 2025 papal conclave, which elected Francis's successor Leo XIV, also attended the mass, as did representatives of Catholic dioceses, representatives of other Christian denominations, and leaders from other religions.

== National representatives ==
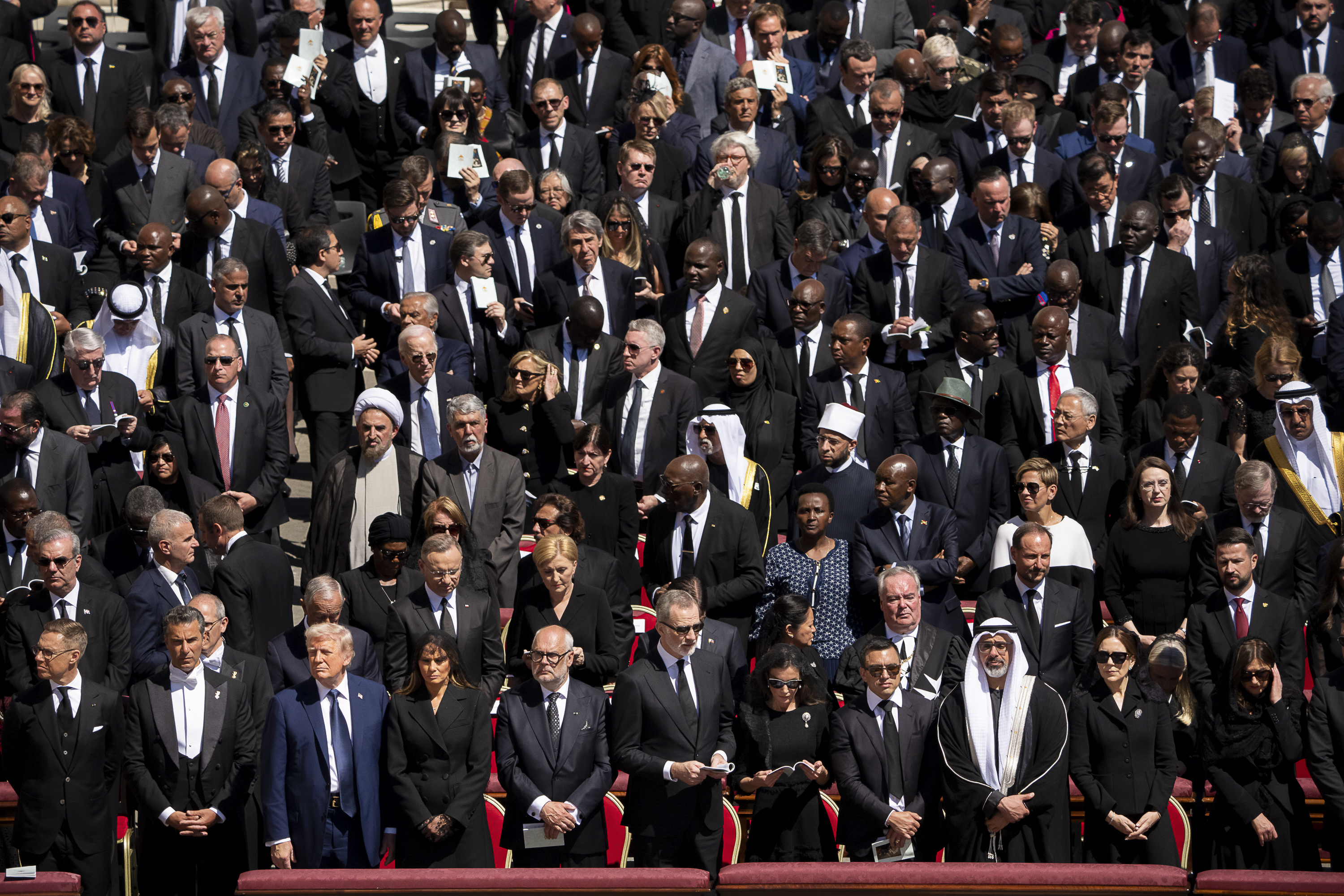
National leaders and representatives at the funeral

=== Heads of state ===
Delegation state	Person (accompanied by)	Head of state position	Ref.
Albania	Bajram Begaj (with Armanda Begaj)	President of Albania	
Andorra	Joan Enric Vives i Sicília	Co-Princes of Andorra	
Andorra	Emmanuel Macron (with Brigitte Macron)	Co-Princes of Andorra	
Angola	João Lourenço (with Ana Dias Lourenço)	President of Angola	
Argentina	Javier Milei	President of Argentina	
Armenia	Vahagn Khachaturyan	President of Armenia	
Austria	Alexander Van der Bellen (with Doris Schmidauer)	President of Austria	
Belgium	Philippe (with Queen Mathilde)	King of the Belgians	
Bosnia and Herzegovina	Željka Cvijanović	Chairwoman of the Presidency of Bosnia and Herzegovina	
Bosnia and Herzegovina	Denis Bećirović	Member of the Presidency of Bosnia and Herzegovina	
Brazil	Luiz Inácio Lula da Silva (with Rosângela Lula da Silva)	President of Brazil	
Cape Verde	José Maria Neves (with Débora Katisa Carvalho)	President of Cape Verde	
Central African Republic	Faustin-Archange Touadéra	President of the Central African Republic	
Croatia	Zoran Milanović (with Sanja Musić Milanović)	President of Croatia	
Cyprus	Nikos Christodoulides	President of Cyprus	
Dominican Republic	Luis Abinader (with Raquel Arbaje)	President of the Dominican Republic	
DR Congo	Félix Tshisekedi (with Denise Nyakéru Tshisekedi)	President of the Democratic Republic of the Congo	
Ecuador	Daniel Noboa	President of Ecuador	
Estonia	Alar Karis	President of Estonia	
Finland	Alexander Stubb	President of Finland	
France	Emmanuel Macron (with Brigitte Macron)	President of France	
Gabon	Brice Oligui Nguema (with Zita Nyangue Oligui)	President of Gabon	
Georgia	Mikheil Kavelashvili	President of Georgia (disputed)	
Germany	Frank-Walter Steinmeier (with Elke Büdenbender)	President of Germany	
Honduras	Xiomara Castro	President of Honduras	
Hungary	Tamás Sulyok (with Zsuzsanna Nagy)	President of Hungary	
Iceland	Halla Tómasdóttir	President of Iceland	
India	Droupadi Murmu	President of India	
Ireland	Michael D. Higgins (with Sabina Higgins)	President of Ireland	
Italy	Sergio Mattarella (with Laura Mattarella)	President of Italy	
Jordan	Abdullah II (with Rania)	King of Jordan	
Kenya	William Ruto	President of Kenya	
Kosovo	Vjosa Osmani (with Prindon Sadriu)	President of Kosovo	
Latvia	Edgars Rinkēvičs	President of Latvia	
Lebanon	Joseph Aoun (with Nehmat Aoun)	President of Lebanon	
Lesotho	Letsie III	King of Lesotho	
Lithuania	Gitanas Nausėda (with Diana Nausėdienė)	President of Lithuania	
Luxembourg	Henri (with Maria Teresa)	Grand Duke of Luxembourg	
Madagascar	Andry Rajoelina (with Mialy Rajoelina)	President of Madagascar	
Malta	Miriam Spiteri Debono (with Anthony Spiteri Debono)	President of Malta	
Moldova	Maia Sandu	President of Moldova	
Monaco	Albert II (with Charlene)	Prince of Monaco	
Montenegro	Jakov Milatović (with Milena Milatović)	President of Montenegro	
Mozambique	Daniel Chapo (with Gueta Chapo)	President of Mozambique	
North Macedonia	Gordana Siljanovska-Davkova	President of North Macedonia	
Philippines	Bongbong Marcos (with Liza Araneta Marcos)	President of the Philippines	
Poland	Andrzej Duda (with Agata Kornhauser-Duda)	President of Poland	
Portugal	Marcelo Rebelo de Sousa	President of Portugal	
Romania	Ilie Bolojan	Acting President of Romania	
San Marino	Denise Bronzetti	Captains Regent of San Marino	
San Marino	Italo Righi	Captains Regent of San Marino	
Seychelles	Wavel Ramkalawan (with Linda Ramkalawan)	President of the Seychelles	
Sierra Leone	Julius Maada Bio	President of Sierra Leone	
Slovakia	Peter Pellegrini	President of Slovakia	
Slovenia	Nataša Pirc Musar (with Aleš Musar)	President of Slovenia	
Sovereign Military Order of Malta	John T. Dunlap	Prince and Grand Master of the Sovereign Military Order of Malta	
Spain	Felipe VI (with Letizia)	King of Spain	
Sweden	Carl XVI Gustaf (with Silvia)	King of Sweden	
Switzerland	Karin Keller-Sutter (with Morton Keller)	President of Switzerland	
Timor-Leste	José Ramos-Horta	President of Timor-Leste	
Togo	Faure Gnassingbé	President of Togo	
Ukraine	Volodymyr Zelenskyy (with Olena Zelenska)	President of Ukraine	
United States	Donald Trump (with Melania Trump)	President of the United States	

=== Representatives of heads of state ===
Delegation state	Person (accompanied by)	Position	Representative of	Ref.
Algeria	Ahmed Attaf	Minister of Foreign Affairs of Algeria	Abdelmadjid Tebboune (President of Algeria)	
Australia	Sam Mostyn (with Simeon Beckett)	Governor-General of Australia	Charles III (King of Australia)	
Bahrain	Abdulla bin Ahmed Al Khalifa	Minister of Transportation and Telecommunications of Bahrain	Hamad bin Isa Al Khalifa (King of Bahrain)	
Bahrain	Nawaf bin Mohammed Al Maawda	Minister of Justice, Islamic Affairs and Endowments of Bahrain	Hamad bin Isa Al Khalifa (King of Bahrain)	
Belarus	Igor Sergeenko	Speaker of the House of Representatives of Belarus	Alexander Lukashenko (President of Belarus)	
Burundi	Prosper Bazombanza (with Marie Ndenganyo)	Vice-President of Burundi	Évariste Ndayishimiye (President of Burundi)	
Belize	Froyla Tzalam (with Daniel Mendez)	Governor-General of Belize	Charles III (King of Belize)	
Cameroon	Paul Atanga Nji	Minister of Territorial Administration of Cameroon	Paul Biya (President of Cameroon)	
Canada	Mary Simon (with Whit Fraser)	Governor General of Canada	Charles III (King of Canada)	
Chad	Mathieu Guibolo Fanga	Minister of Commerce and Industry of Chad	Mahamat Déby (President of Chad)	
China, Republic of	Chen Chien-jen (with Lo Feng-ping)	Former Vice President of the Republic of China (2016–2020)	Lai Ching-te (President of the Republic of China)	
Colombia	Verónica Alcocer	First Lady of Colombia	Gustavo Petro (President of Colombia)	
Cuba	Salvador Valdés Mesa	Vice President of Cuba	Miguel Díaz-Canel (First Secretary and President of Cuba)	
Denmark	Mary	Queen consort of Denmark	Frederik X (King of Denmark)	
Egypt	Osama al-Azhari	Minister of Religious Endowment of Egypt	Abdel Fattah el-Sisi (President of Egypt)	
El Salvador	Félix Ulloa (with Lilian Alvarengo de Ulloa)	Vice President of El Salvador	Nayib Bukele (President of El Salvador)	
Equatorial Guinea	Constancia Mangue	First Lady of Equatorial Guinea	Teodoro Obiang Nguema Mbasogo (President of Equatorial Guinea)	
Eswatini	Thuli Dladla	Deputy Prime Minister of Eswatini	Mswati III (King of Eswatini)	
The Gambia	Henry Gomez	Special Adviser to the President of the Gambia	Adama Barrow (President of the Gambia)	
Guatemala	Liwy Grazioso	Minister of Culture and Sports of Guatemala	Bernardo Arévalo (President of Guatemala)	
Indonesia	Joko Widodo	Former President of Indonesia (2014–2024)	Prabowo Subianto (President of Indonesia)	
Iraq	Nechirvan Barzani	President of Kurdistan Region	Abdul Latif Rashid (President of Iraq)	
Ivory Coast	Gilbert Koné Kafana	High Representative of the Head of State of Ivory Coast	Alassane Ouattara (President of Ivory Coast)	
Liechtenstein	Alois (with Sophie)	Hereditary Prince and Regent of Liechtenstein	Hans-Adam II (Prince of Liechtenstein)	
Mexico	Rosa Icela Rodríguez	Secretary of the Interior of Mexico	Claudia Sheinbaum (President of Mexico)	
Morocco	Aziz Akhannouch	Prime Minister of Morocco	Mohammed VI (King of Morocco)	
Namibia	Selma Ashipala-Musavyi	Minister of International Relations and Trade of Namibia	Netumbo Nandi-Ndaitwah (President of Namibia)	
Nigeria	Godswill Akpabio	President of the Senate of Nigeria	Bola Tinubu (President of Nigeria)	
Norway	Haakon (with Mette-Marit)	Crown Prince of Norway	Harald V (King of Norway)	
Panama	Javier Martínez-Acha	Minister of Foreign Affairs of Panama	José Raúl Mulino (President of Panama)	
Paraguay	Raúl Latorre	President of the Chamber of Deputies of Paraguay	Santiago Peña (President of Paraguay)	
Peru	Elmer Schialer	Minister of Foreign Affairs of Peru	Dina Boluarte (President of Peru)	
Russia	Olga Lyubimova	Minister of Culture of Russia	Vladimir Putin (President of Russia)	
Saudi Arabia	Adel Al-Jubeir	Minister of State for Foreign Affairs, Cabinet Member, and Climate Envoy of Saudi Arabia	Salman (King of Saudi Arabia)	
Senegal	Jean Baptiste Tine	Minister of Interior and Public Security of Senegal	Bassirou Diomaye Faye (President of Senegal)	
South Korea	Yu In-chon	Minister of Culture, Sports and Tourism of South Korea	Han Duck-soo (Acting President of South Korea)	
South Sudan	Monday Semaya Kumba	Minister of Foreign Affairs and International Cooperation of South Sudan	Salva Kiir (President of South Sudan)	
Syria	Hind Kabawat	Minister of Social and Labour Affairs of Syria	Ahmed al-Sharaa (President of Syria)	
Tanzania	Philip Mpango	Vice-President of Tanzania	Samia Suluhu Hassan (President of Tanzania)	
Tunisia	Mohamed Ali Nafti	Minister of Foreign Affairs of Tunisia	Kais Saied (President of Tunisia)	
Uganda	Anita Among	Speaker of the Parliament of Uganda	Yoweri Museveni (President of Uganda)	
United Arab Emirates	Khaled bin Mohamed Al Nahyan	Crown Prince of Abu Dhabi	Mohamed bin Zayed Al Nahyan (President of the United Arab Emirates)	
United Kingdom	William	Prince of Wales	Charles III (King of the United Kingdom)	
Uruguay	Mario Lubetkin	Minister of Foreign Affairs of Uruguay	Yamandú Orsi (President of Uruguay)	
Venezuela	Yván Gil	Minister of Foreign Affairs of Venezuela	Nicolás Maduro (President of Venezuela)	
Zambia	Mulambo Haimbe	Minister of Foreign Affairs and International Cooperation of Zambia	Hakainde Hichilema (President of Zambia)	
Zimbabwe	Constantino Chiwenga	First Vice-President of Zimbabwe	Emmerson Mnangagwa (President of Zimbabwe)	

=== Heads of government ===
Delegation state	Person (accompanied by)	Head of government position	Ref.
Andorra	Xavier Espot Zamora	Prime Minister of Andorra	
Austria	Christian Stocker	Chancellor of Austria	
Bangladesh	Muhammad Yunus	Chief Adviser of Bangladesh	
Belgium	Bart De Wever	Prime Minister of Belgium	
Bosnia and Herzegovina	Borjana Krišto	Chair of Council of Ministers of Bosnia and Herzegovina	
Bulgaria	Rosen Zhelyazkov	Prime Minister of Bulgaria	
Croatia	Andrej Plenković (with Ana Maslać Plenković)	Prime Minister of Croatia	
Czech Republic	Petr Fiala (with Jana Fialová)	Prime Minister of the Czech Republic	
Germany	Olaf Scholz	Chancellor of Germany	
Greece	Kyriakos Mitsotakis (with Mareva Grabowski-Mitsotakis)	Prime Minister of Greece	
Hungary	Viktor Orbán (with Anikó Lévai)	Prime Minister of Hungary	
Ireland	Micheál Martin	Taoiseach of Ireland	
Italy	Giorgia Meloni	Prime Minister of Italy	
Kosovo	Albin Kurti (with Rita Augestad Knudsen)	Prime Minister of Kosovo	
Luxembourg	Luc Frieden (with Marjolijne Droogleever Fortuyn)	Prime Minister of Luxembourg	
Malta	Robert Abela (with Lydia Abela)	Prime Minister of Malta	
Netherlands	Dick Schoof	Prime Minister of the Netherlands	
New Zealand	Christopher Luxon	Prime Minister of New Zealand	
Palestine	Mohammad Mustafa	Prime Minister of Palestine	
Portugal	Luís Montenegro	Prime Minister of Portugal	
Qatar	Mohammed bin Abdulrahman bin Jassim Al Thani	Prime Minister of Qatar	
Romania	Marcel Ciolacu	Prime Minister of Romania	
Serbia	Đuro Macut	Prime Minister of Serbia	
Slovenia	Robert Golob (with Tina Gaber)	Prime Minister of Slovenia	
Sweden	Ulf Kristersson	Prime Minister of Sweden	
United Kingdom	Keir Starmer (with Victoria Starmer)	Prime Minister of the United Kingdom	

=== Ambassadors ===
Unless otherwise stated, all listed ambassadors are accredited to the Holy See.

Ambassador headed their country's delegation

Delegation state	Person (accompanied by)	Status	Ref.
Andorra	Carles Álvarez Marfany	Ambassador	
Armenia	Boris Sahakyan	Ambassador	
Australia	Keith Pitt	Ambassador-designate	
Azerbaijan	İlqar Muxtarov	Ambassador	
Bahamas	Joseph Curry (with Terez Curry)	Ambassador	
Bahrain	Essam bin Abdulaziz Al Jassim	Ambassador to France and non-resident Ambassador to the Holy See	
Belarus	Yury Ambrazevich	Ambassador	
Belarus	Kirill Petrovsky	Chargé d'affaires to Italy	
Belgium	Bruno van der Pluijm	Ambassador	
Belize	Jaime Briceño	Ambassador	
Bolivia	Teresa Susana Subieta	Ambassador	
Bulgaria	Kostadin Kodzhabashev	Ambassador	
Colombia	Alberto Ospina Carreño	Ambassador	
Costa Rica	Federico Zamora	Ambassador	
Czech Republic	Pavel Svoboda	Ambassador	
Denmark	Susanne Shine	Ambassador	
Ecuador	Jorge Edmundo Uribe Pérez	Ambassador	
Egypt	Omar Ghobash	Ambassador	
El Salvador	Julieta Anabella Machuca	Ambassador	
France	Florence Mangin	Ambassador	
Haiti	Lilas Desquiron	Ambassador to UNESCO	
Haiti	Gandy Thomas	Ambassador-designate to Italy	
Hungary	Eduard Habsburg-Lothringen	Ambassador	
Iran	Mohammad Hossein Mokhtari	Ambassador	
Iraq	Rahman Farhan Abdullah Alaameri	Ambassador	
Ireland	Frances Collins	Ambassador	
Israel	Yaron Sideman	Ambassador	
Ivory Coast	Vhangha Patrice Koffi	Ambassador	
Jamaica	Richard Brown	Ambassador	
Kuwait	Nasser Alqahtani	Ambassador	
Kyrgyzstan	Taalai Bazarbaev	Ambassador to Italy and non-resident Ambassador to the Holy See	
Malawi	Joseph Mpinganjira	Ambassador	
Malta	Frank Zammit	Ambassador	
Mexico	Alberto Barranco Chavarría	Ambassador	
Mongolia	Davaasuren Gerelmaa	Ambassador	
Morocco	Rajae Naji Mekkaoui	Ambassador	
Myanmar	Hmway Hmway Khyne (with Hla Moe)	Ambassador	
Namibia	Martin Andjaba	Ambassador to Germany and non-resident Ambassador to the Holy See	
Netherlands	Annemieke Ruigrok	Ambassador	
Nicaragua	Maurizio Gelli (with Farah Gutiérrez)	Ambassador to Spain	
Nicaragua	Mónica Robelo	Ambassador to Italy	
Oman	Nazar bin Al Julanda bin Majid Al Said	Ambassador	
Papua New Guinea	Joseph Varo	Ambassador to Belgium	
Paraguay	Romina Taboada Tonina	Ambassador	
Paraguay	María José Argaña Mateu	Ambassador to Italy	
Rwanda	Igor César	Ambassador to Germany and non-resident Ambassador to the Holy See	
Qatar	Asma Naji Al-Amri	Ambassador	
Saint Vincent and the Grenadines	Wafic Saïd	Ambassador	
San Marino	Maria Alessandra Albertini	Ambassador	
Saudi Arabia	Prince Faisal bin Sattam Al Saud	Ambassador to Italy	
Slovakia	Juraj Priputen	Ambassador	
Slovenia	Franc But	Ambassador	
Sudan	Salah Mohamed Ishag Rahama	Chargé d'affaires	
Sudan	Mohamed Elmouataz Jafar Eltayeb Osman	Chargé d'affaires to Italy	
Sweden	Per Holmström	Ambassador	
Switzerland	Manuela Leimgruber	Ambassador	
United Arab Emirates	Omar Ghobash	Ambassador	
United Kingdom	Christopher J. Trott	Ambassador	
Uzbekistan	Farrouk Tursunov	Ambassador	
Vanuatu	Bernard Leclerc	Ambassador	
Vietnam	Dương Hải Hưng	Ambassador	

=== Other officials ===
==== Argentina ====
- Karina Milei, General Secretary of the Presidency of the Argentine Nation
- Guillermo Francos, Chief of the Cabinet of Ministers of Argentina
- Gerardo Werthein, Minister of Foreign Affairs, International Trade and Worship of Argentina
- Patricia Bullrich, Minister of Security of Argentina
- Sandra Pettovello, Minister of Human Capital of Argentina
- Manuel Adorni, Spokesperson and Communications Officer of the Government of Argentina

==== Australia ====
- Don Farrell, Special Minister of State and Minister for Trade and Tourism of Australia
- Michael McCormack, former Deputy Prime Minister of Australia

==== Brazil ====
- Dilma Rousseff, former President of Brazil (2011–2016)
- Davi Alcolumbre, President of the Federal Senate of Brazil
- Hugo Motta, President of the Chamber of Deputies of Brazil
- Luís Roberto Barroso, President of the Supreme Federal Court of Brazil
- Mauro Vieira, Minister of Foreign Relations of Brazil
- Ricardo Lewandowski, Minister of Justice and Public Safety of Brazil

==== Bulgaria ====
- Atanas Zafirov, Deputy Prime Minister of Bulgaria
- Grozdan Karadzhov, Deputy Prime Minister and Minister of Transport and Communications of Bulgaria
- Georg Georgiev, Minister of Foreign Affairs of Bulgaria

==== Canada ====
- Richard Wagner, Chief Justice of Canada
- Raymonde Gagné, Speaker of the Senate of Canada
- Martine Biron, Minister of International Relations and La Francophonie of Quebec (Canada)
- David Chartrand, President of the Manitoba Métis Federation (Canada)

==== Chile ====
- Manuel José Ossandón, President of the Senate of Chile
- José Miguel Castro, President of the Chamber of Deputies of Chile
- Alberto van Klaveren, Minister of Foreign Affairs of Chile

==== Czech Republic ====
- Marian Jurečka, Deputy Prime Minister, Minister of Labour and Social Affairs of the Czech Republic
- Petr Hladík, Minister of Environment of the Czech Republic

==== France ====
- Jean-Noël Barrot, Minister of Europe and Foreign Affairs of France
- Bruno Retailleau, Minister of the Interior of France

==== Georgia ====
- Maka Bochorishvili, Minister of Foreign Affairs of Georgia
- Ketevan Kvinikadze, Chief of Staff of the President of Georgia

==== Germany ====
- Julia Klöckner, President of the Bundestag
- Anke Rehlinger, President of the Bundesrat and Minister-President of Saarland
- Stephan Harbarth, President of the Federal Constitutional Court of Germany
- Markus Söder, Minister-President of Bavaria

==== Honduras ====
- Héctor Zelaya Castro, Private Secretary of the Presidency of Honduras
- Eduardo Enrique Reina, Minister of Foreign Affairs of Honduras

==== Hungary ====
- Zsolt Semjén, Deputy Prime Minister of Hungary
- Miklós Soltész, Secretary of State for Churches, Minorities and Civil Affairs of Hungary
- László György Lukács, Member of the National Assembly of Hungary
- Péter Magyar, Member of the European Parliament for Hungary

==== India ====
- Kiren Rijiju, Minister of Parliamentary Affairs and Minority Affairs of India
- George Kurian, Minister of State for Minority Affairs and Fisheries, Animal Husbandry and Dairying of India
- Joshua De Souza, Deputy Speaker of Goa Legislative Assembly
- Roshy Augustine, Minister of Water Resources representing Government of Kerala
- S. M. Nasar, Minister for Minorities Welfare and Non-Resident Tamils Welfare of Tamil Nadu
- Inigo S. Irudayaraj, Member of the Tamil Nadu Legislative Assembly

==== Indonesia ====
- Natalius Pigai, Minister of Human Rights of Indonesia
- Thomas Djiwandono, Deputy Minister of Finance of Indonesia
- Ignasius Jonan, former Minister of Energy and Mineral Resources (2016–2019), former Minister of Transportation of Indonesia (2014–2016), and Chairman of the Committee of the Apostolic Visit in Indonesia (September 2024), appointed by the Bishops' Conference of Indonesia (KWI).

==== Italy ====
- Matteo Renzi, former Prime Minister of Italy (2014–2016)
- Paolo Gentiloni, former Prime Minister of Italy (2016–2018)
- Giuseppe Conte, former Prime Minister of Italy (2018–2021)
- Mario Draghi, former Prime Minister of Italy (2021–2022)
- Ignazio La Russa, President of the Senate of Italy
- Lorenzo Fontana, President of the Chamber of Deputies of Italy
- Luciano Violante, former President of the Chamber of Deputies of Italy (1996–2001)
- Pier Ferdinando Casini, former President of the Chamber of Deputies of Italy (2001–2006)
- Fausto Bertinotti, former President of the Chamber of Deputies of Italy (2006–2008)
- Laura Boldrini, former President of the Chamber of Deputies of Italy (2013–2018)
- Giovanni Amoroso, President of the Constitutional Court of Italy
- Antonio Tajani, Deputy Prime Minister and Minister of Foreign Affairs of Italy
- Matteo Salvini, Deputy Prime Minister and Minister of Infrastructure and Transport of Italy
- Giancarlo Giorgetti, Minister of Economy and Finance of Italy
- Adolfo Urso, Minister of Business and Made in Italy
- Francesco Lollobrigida, Minister of Agriculture of Italy
- Alessandro Giuli, Minister of Culture of Italy
- Giuseppe Valditara, Minister of Education of Italy
- Anna Maria Bernini, Minister of University and Research of Italy
- Alfredo Mantovano, Secretary of the Council of Ministers of Italy
- Elly Schlein, Member of the Chamber of Deputies of Italy
- Michele Emiliano, President of Apulia
- Michele De Pascale, President of Emilia-Romagna
- Francesco Rocca, President of Lazio
- Stefania Proietti, President of Umbria
- Roberto Gualtieri, Mayor of Rome

==== Malaysia ====
- Ewon Benedick, Minister of Entrepreneur Development and Cooperatives of Malaysia
- Azalina Othman Said, Minister of Law and Institutional Reform of Malaysia

==== Mali ====
- Moussa Ag Attaher, Minister for Malians Living Abroad and African Integration of Mali
- Daniel Siméon Kelema, Minister of Agriculture of Mali

==== Poland ====
- Szymon Hołownia, Marshal of the Polish Sejm
- Władysław Kosiniak-Kamysz, Deputy Prime Minister and Minister of National Defence of Poland

==== Portugal ====
- José Pedro Aguiar-Branco, President of the Assembly of the Republic of Portugal
- Paulo Rangel, Minister of Foreign Affairs of Portugal

==== Sovereign Military Order of Malta ====
- Emmanuel Rousseau, Grand Commander of the Sovereign Military Order of Malta
- Riccardo Paternò di Montecupo, Grand Chancellor of the Sovereign Military Order of Malta

==== Spain ====
- María Jesús Montero, First Deputy Prime Minister of Spain
- Yolanda Díaz, Second Deputy Prime Minister of Spain
- Félix Bolaños, Minister of the Presidency and Justice of Spain
- Alberto Núñez Feijóo, Leader of the Opposition in the Congress of Deputies of Spain

==== United Kingdom ====
- David Lammy, Secretary of State for Foreign, Commonwealth and Development Affairs of the United Kingdom
- Michelle O'Neill, First Minister of Northern Ireland
- John Swinney, First Minister of Scotland

==== United States ====
- Susie Wiles, White House Chief of Staff
- Dan Scavino, White House Deputy Chief of Staff
- Mike Waltz, National Security Advisor
- Joe Biden, former President of the United States (2021–2025), and former First Lady Jill Biden
- Senate delegation consisting of:
  - Susan Collins, Chair of the Senate Committee on Appropriations
  - Dick Durbin
  - Mike Rounds
  - Edward Markey
  - Eric Schmitt
- House of Representatives delegation consisting of:
  - Steve Scalise, House Majority Leader
  - French Hill
  - Nancy Pelosi
  - Brendan Boyle
  - Ann Wagner
  - Tom Suozzi
  - John Joyce
  - Pete Stauber
  - Scott Fitzgerald
  - Laura Gillen

==== Other countries ====
Official headed their country's delegation

Delegation state	Person (accompanied by)	Status	Ref.
Angola	Tete António	Minister of Foreign Affairs	
Azerbaijan	Sahiba Gafarova	President of the National Assembly	
Belarus (opposition)	Dzianis Kuchynski	Diplomatic advisor to opposition leader Sviatlana Tsikhanouskaya	
Burkina Faso	Karamoko Jean-Marie Traoré	Minister of Foreign Affairs	
Central African Republic	Sylvie Baïpo-Temon	Minister of Foreign Affairs	
China, Republic of	Wu Chih-chung	Deputy Minister of Foreign Affairs	
Colombia	Laura Sarabia	Minister of Foreign Affairs	
Dominican Republic	Alfredo Pacheco	President of the Chamber of Deputies	
Ecuador	Gabriela Sommerfeld	Minister of Foreign Affairs	
Equatorial Guinea	Teodoro Nguema Obiang Mangue	Vice President	
Eswatini	Phila Buthelezi	Minister of Labour and Social Security	
Gabon	Brigitte Onkanowa	Minister of National Defense	
Iceland	Þorgerður Katrín Gunnarsdóttir	Minister of Foreign Affairs	
Iran	Abbas Salehi	Minister of Culture	
Ireland	Simon Harris	Tánaiste and former Taoiseach of Ireland (2024–2025)	
Ivory Coast	Anne Désirée Ouloto	Minister of State and Public Service	
Japan	Takeshi Iwaya	Minister for Foreign Affairs	
Kenya	Moses Wetang'ula	Speaker of the National Assembly	
Kyrgyzstan	Ayaz Baetov	Minister of Justice	
Malta	Bernard Grech	Leader of the Opposition	
Mauritius	Gavin Glover (with Marie Glover)	Attorney General	
Mongolia	Battsetseg Batmunkh	Minister of Foreign Affairs	
Netherlands	Caspar Veldkamp	Minister of Foreign Affairs	
Nigeria	Bianca Odumegwu-Ojukwu	Minister of State for Foreign Affairs	
North Macedonia	Timčo Mucunski	Minister of Foreign Affairs	
Norway	Espen Barth Eide	Minister of Foreign Affairs	
Pakistan	Chaudhry Salik Hussain	Minister for Human Resources Development	
San Marino	Luca Beccari	Secretary for Foreign and Political Affairs	
Seychelles	Sylvestre Radegonde	Minister of Foreign Affairs and Tourism	
Singapore	Maliki Osman	Minister in the Prime Minister's Office, Second Minister for Education, and Second Minister for Foreign Affairs	
Sri Lanka	Vijitha Herath	Minister of Foreign Affairs	
Thailand	Chousak Sirinil	Minister of the Prime Minister's Office	
Timor-Leste	Bendito Freitas	Minister of Foreign Affairs and Cooperation	
Turkey	Numan Kurtulmuş	Speaker of the Grand National Assembly	
United Arab Emirates	Sheikh Nahyan bin Mubarak Al Nahyan	Minister of Tolerance and Coexistence	
Uzbekistan	Sodiq Safoyev	First Deputy Chairperson of the Senate	
Venezuela	Carmen Meléndez	Mayor of Caracas	
Zambia	Charles Milupi	Minister of Infrastructure, Housing and Urban Development	

== International organizations ==
=== Council of Europe ===
- Bjørn Berge, Deputy Secretary General of the Council of Europe
- Theodoros Roussopoulos, President of the Parliamentary Assembly of the Council of Europe

=== European Union ===
- António Costa, President of the European Council
- Ursula von der Leyen, President of the European Commission
- Roberta Metsola, President of the European Parliament
- Kaja Kallas, High Representative of the European Union for Foreign Affairs and Security Policy

=== International Fund for Agricultural Development ===
- Álvaro Lario, President of the United Nations International Fund for Agricultural Development
- Gérardine Mukeshimana, Vice-President of the International Fund for Agricultural Development

=== World Council of Churches ===
- Jerry Pillay, Secretary General of the World Council of Churches
- Bishop Heinrich Bedford-Strohm, Moderator of the Central Committee of the World Council of Churches

=== Other organizations ===
- Gianni Infantino, President of FIFA
- Maurizio Martina, Deputy Director-General of the Food and Agriculture Organization
- Gilbert Houngbo, Director-General of the International Labour Organization
- Amy E. Pope, Director General of the International Organization for Migration
- Pia Kauma, President of the Parliamentary Assembly of the Organization for Security and Co-operation in Europe
- António Guterres, Secretary-General of the United Nations
- Chiara Cardoletti, UNHCR Representative for Italy
- Carl Skau, Deputy Executive Director of the World Food Program
- Tedros Adhanom Ghebreyesus, Director-General of the World Health Organization

== Descendants of deposed royal families ==
- House of Bourbon-Two Sicilies:
  - Prince Pedro, Duke of Calabria and Sofia, Duchess of Calabria
    - Prince Jaime, Duke of Noto and Charlotte, Duchess of Noto
    - Prince Juan of Bourbon-Two Sicilies
    - Prince Pablo of Bourbon-Two Sicilies
    - Prince Pedro of Bourbon-Two Sicilies
    - Princess Sofía of Bourbon-Two Sicilies
    - Princess Blanca of Bourbon-Two Sicilies
    - Princess María of Bourbon-Two Sicilies
  - Prince Carlo, Duke of Castro
- House of Borghese, Neapolitan branch:
  - Prince Flavio Borghese (President of the Italian Royal Commission of the Constantinian Order)
- House of Bourbon-Parma, Dutch branch:
  - Prince Carlos, Duke of Parma
  - Prince Jaime, Count of Bardi
- House of Savoy:
  - Emanuele Filiberto, Prince of Venice
  - Prince Aimone, Duke of Aosta and Princess Olga, Duchess of Aosta
- House of Habsburg-Lorraine:
  - Archduke Ferdinand Zvonimir of Austria
- House of Windisch-Graetz:
  - Mariano Hugo, Prince of Windisch-Graetz

== Religious representatives ==
=== Catholic Church ===
==== Archbishops ====
- Cardinal Jose Advincula, Archbishop of Manila (Note: Cardinal elector in the 2025 papal conclave)
- Luis Argüello, Archbishop of Valladolid and President of the Spanish Episcopal Conference
- Donald Bolen, Archbishop of Regina
- Cardinal Leopoldo Brenes, Archbishop of Managua
- Cardinal Stephen Breslin, President of the Southern African Bishops' Conference
- José Rodríguez Carballo, Archbishop of Mérida-Badajoz
- Ignatius Chama, Archbishop of Kasama and President of the Zambia Conference of Catholic Bishops
- Cardinal Fernando Chomalí Garib, Archbishop of Santiago
  - Cardinal Celestino Aós Braco, Archbishop emeritus of Santiago
- Cardinal José Cobo Cano, Archbishop of Madrid and Vicepresident of the Spanish Episcopal Conference
- Timothy Costelloe, Archbishop of Perth and President of the Australian Catholic Bishops' Conference
- Cardinal Blase J. Cupich, Archbishop of Chicago
- Cardinal John Dew, Archbishop emeritus of Wellington
- Arjan Dodaj, Metropolitan Archbishop of Tirana and Durrës
- Cardinal Stanisław Dziwisz, Metropolitan Archbishop emeritus of Kraków
- Dermot Farrell, Archbishop of Dublin and Primate of Ireland
- Adrian Galbas, Metropolitan Archbishop of Warsaw
- Cardinal William Goh, Archbishop of Singapore
- Marek Jędraszewski, Metropolitan Archbishop of Kraków
- Ignatius Ayau Kaigama, Archbishop of Abuja
- Matthew Hassan Kukah, Archbishop of Sokoto
- Franz Lackner, Archbishop of Salzburg
- Cardinal Gérald Lacroix, Archbishop of Quebec and Primate of Canada
- Cardinal Frank Leo, Archbishop of Toronto
  - Cardinal Thomas Collins, Archbishop emeritus of Toronto
- Cardinal Roger Mahony, Archbishop emeritus of Los Angeles
- Eamon Martin, Archbishop of Armagh, Primate of All Ireland and President of the Irish Catholic Bishops' Conference
- Joseph Nguyễn Năng, Metropolitan Archbishop of Ho Chi Minh City and President of the Catholic Bishops' Conference of Vietnam
- Cardinal Vincent Nichols, Archbishop of Westminster
- Juan Nsue Edjang Mayé, Archbishop of Malabo
- Cardinal Kazimierz Nycz, Metropolitan Archbishop emeritus of Warsaw
- Mark O'Toole, Archbishop of Cardiff-Menevia
- Giovanni Peragine, Archbishop of Shkodra and Pult
- Cardinal Orlando Quevedo, Archbishop emeritus of Cotabato
- José Rafael Quirós Quirós, Metropolitan Archbishop of San José
- Cardinal Grzegorz Ryś, Metropolitan Archbishop of Łódź
- Cardinal Christoph Schönborn, Archbishop emeritus of Vienna
- Lucius Iwejuru Ugorji, Archbishop of Owerri and President of the Catholic Bishops' Conference of Nigeria
- Tadeusz Wojda, Metropolitan Archbishop of Gdańsk and President of the Polish Episcopal Conference
- Cardinal Andrew Yeom Soo-jung, Archbishop emeritus of Seoul

==== Bishops ====
- Antonius Subianto Bunjamin, Bishop of Bandung and President of the Bishops' Conference of Indonesia
- Cardinal Gregorio Rosa Chávez, Auxiliary Bishop emeritus of San Salvador
- Cardinal Stephen Chow, Bishop of Hong Kong
- Andrzej Czaja, Bishop of Opole
- Cardinal Pablo Virgilio David, Bishop of Kalookan and president of the Catholic Bishops' Conference of the Philippines
- Benno Elbs, Bishop of Feldkirch
- Cardinal Sebastian Francis, Bishop of Penang
- Francisco César García Magán, Auxiliary Bishop of Toledo and Secretary General of the Spanish Episcopal Conference
- Juan Ignacio González Errázuriz, Bishop of San Bernardo
- John Keenan, Bishop of Paisley
- Wilhelm Krautwaschl, Bishop of Graz-Seckau
- Cardinal Soane Patita Paini Mafi, Bishop of Tonga and Niue
- William McGrattan, Bishop of Calgary
- Sławomir Oder, Bishop of Gliwice
- Wojciech Osial, Bishop of Łowicz
- Cardinal Maurice Piat, Bishop emeritus of Port-Louis
- Fernando Prado Ayuso, Bishop of San Sebastián
- Cardinal Robert Francis Prevost (the future Pope Leo XIV), Prefect of the Dicastery for Bishops
- Jesús Pulido Arriero, Bishop of Coria-Cáceres
- Cardinal Álvaro Leonel Ramazzini Imeri, Bishop of Huehuetenango
- Mathias Ri Iong-hoon, President of the Catholic Bishops' Conference of Korea
- Sebastià Taltavull, Bishop of Mallorca
- Ernesto Brotóns Tena, Bishop of Plasencia
- Cardinal Joseph Zen, Bishop emeritus of Hong Kong
- Ägidius Zsifkovics, Bishop of Eisenstadt

==== Other ====
- Cardinal Michael Czerny, Prefect of the Dicastery for Promoting Integral Human Development
- Georgy Kenny, vicar general of the Diocese of Port-Louis
- Lim Min-kyun, Director of the public relations department of the Catholic Bishops' Conference of Korea
- Cardinal Giorgio Marengo, Apostolic Prefect of Ulaanbaatar, representing Central Asian Catholics
- Cardinal Marc Ouellet, Prefect emeritus of the Dicastery for Bishops
- Cardinal Giovanni Battista Re, Dean of the College of Cardinals
- Cardinal Ernest Simoni, Deacon of the Santa Maria della Scala
- Cardinal Luis Antonio Tagle, Pro-Prefect for the Section of First Evangelization of the Dicastery for Evangelization

==== Eastern Catholic churches ====
===== Patriarchs =====
- Youssef Absi, Patriarch of Antioch and of All the East of the Melkite Greek Catholic Church
- Raphaël Bedros XXI Minassian, Patriarch of Cilicia and Catholicos of the Armenian Catholic Church
- Cardinal Louis Raphaël I Sako, Patriarch of Baghdad of the Chaldean Catholic Church
- Ignatius Joseph III Yonan, Patriarch of Antioch and all the East of the Syrians of the Syriac Catholic Church

===== Major Archbishops =====
- Cardinal George Alencherry, Major Archbishop Emeritus of Ernakulam-Angamaly and the Syro-Malabar Church
- Cardinal Baselios Cleemis, Major Archbishop of Thiruvananthapuram and Catholicos of the Syro-Malankara Catholic Church
- Sviatoslav Shevchuk, Major Archbishop of Kyiv-Galicia and Primate of the Ukrainian Greek Catholic Church
- Raphael Thattil, Major Archbishop of Ernakulam-Angamaly and the Syro-Malabar Catholic Church

===== Metropolitan Archbishops =====
- Borys Gudziak, Metropolitan Archbishop of the Ukrainian Catholic Archeparchy of Philadelphia
- Péter Fülöp Kocsis, Metropolitan Archbishop of the Archeparchy of Hajdúdorog and Primate of the Hungarian Greek Catholic Church
- Jonáš Maxim, Metropolitan Archbishop of Prešov and Primate of the Slovak Greek Catholic Church
- William C. Skurla, Metropolitan Archbishop of Pittsburgh and Primate of the Ruthenian Greek Catholic Church
- Cardinal Berhaneyesus Demerew Souraphiel, Metropolitan Archbishop of Addis Abeba of the Ethiopian Catholic Church

===== Bishops =====
- Virgil Bercea, Bishop of Oradea Mare (representing the Major Archbishop of the Romanian Greek Catholic Church)
- Cardinal Mykola Bychok, Bishop of the Ukrainian Catholic Eparchy of Saints Peter and Paul of Melbourne
- Cristian Dumitru Crișan, Auxiliary Bishop of Făgăraș and Alba Iulia (representing the Major Archbishop of the Romanian Greek Catholic Church)
- Hryhoriy Komar, Apostolic Administrator of the Ukrainian Catholic Apostolic Exarchate of Italy
- Cardinal George Koovakad, Prefect of the Dicastery for Interreligious Dialogue
- Kenneth Nowakowski, Bishop of the Ukrainian Catholic Eparchy of the Holy Family of London
- Donato Oliverio, Bishop of the Eparchy of Lungro of the Italo-Albanian Catholic Church
- Youhanna Rafic Warcha, Procurator of the Maronite Church at the Holy See (representing the Maronite Patriarch of Antioch)

=== Anglican communion ===
==== Archbishops ====
- Stephen Cottrell, Archbishop of York and Primate of England
- Philip Freier, former Archbishop of Melbourne and Primate of Australia
- Hosam Naoum, Archbishop in Jerusalem, President Bishop of the Episcopal Church in Jerusalem and the Middle East, and Vice-Chair of the Anglican Consultative Council

==== Bishops ====
- Marinez Santos Bassotto, Bishop of the Amazon and Primate of the Anglican Episcopal Church of Brazil
- Robert Innes, Bishop in Europe
- Dame Sarah Mullally, Bishop of London

==== Other ====
- Anthony Ball, Director of the Anglican Centre in Rome and Representative of the Archbishop of Canterbury to the Holy See
- Anthony Poggo, Secretary General of the Anglican Communion
- Canon Maggie Swinson, Chair of the Anglican Consultative Council
- Canon Dr. Christopher Wells, Director of Unity, Faith and Order, Anglican Communion Office

=== Eastern Orthodox churches ===
- Bartholomew I, Ecumenical Patriarch of Constantinople
- Metropolitan John, Archbishop of Albania
- Metropolitan Anthony of Volokolamsk, Primate of the Patriarchal Exarchate in Western Europe and Chairman of the Department for External Church Relations of the Moscow Patriarchate
- Metropolitan Gerasime, Eparch of Zugdidi and Tsaishi and Chairman of the Patriarchate's Department for External Relations, Georgian Orthodox Church
- Metropolitan Rastislav Gont, Archbishop of Prešov of the Czech Lands and Slovakia
- Protopresbyter Giorgi Zviadadze, Rector of the Tbilisi Theological Academy and Seminary

=== Lutheran churches ===
- Pastor Michael Jonas, representative of the Evangelical Lutheran Church in Italy
- Dirk Lange, Assistant General Secretary for Ecumenical Relations, Lutheran World Federation
- Martin Modéus, Archbishop of Uppsala and Primate of the Church of Sweden
- Henrik Stubkjær, Bishop of Viborg and President of the Lutheran World Federation

=== Methodist churches ===
- Edgardo Colón-Emeric, Methodist Co-Chair of the Joint Dialogue Between the World Methodist Council and the Roman Catholic Church and Chair of the Ecumenical and Interreligious Relations Committee of the World Methodist Council
- Casely Essamuah, ordained minister of the Methodist Church Ghana and Secretary of the Global Christian Forum
- Sarah Mae Gabuyo, Pastor of Ponte Sant'Angelo Methodist Church in Rome
- Matthew A. Laferty, Representative of the World Methodist Council to the Holy See and Director of the Methodist Ecumenical Office Rome
- Reynaldo Ferreira Leão Neto, General Secretary of the World Methodist Council
- Bishop Debra Wallace-Padgett, President of the World Methodist Council

=== Oriental Orthodox churches ===
- Ignatius Aphrem II, Syriac Orthodox Patriarch of Antioch and All the East
  - Archbishop Mor Joseph Bali, Patriarchal Assistant and Media Office Director
- Barnaba, Coptic Bishop of Turin and Rome (representing Pope Tawadros II of Alexandria)
  - Angaelos, Coptic Bishop of London
  - Antonio, Coptic Bishop of Milan
  - Kyrillos, Coptic Bishop of Los Angeles
- Karekin II, Catholicos of All Armenians
- Aram I, Armenian Catholicos of Cilicia

=== Other Christian denominations ===
- Elder Rubén V. Alliaud, General Authority Seventy of the Church of Jesus Christ of Latter-day Saints and president of the Church’s Europe Central Area
- Mar Awa III, Catholicos-Patriarch of the Assyrian Church of the East

=== Other religions ===
- Nader Akkad, imam of the mosque of Rome
- Riccardo Di Segni, Chief Rabbi of Rome
- Yassine Lafram, President of Union of Islamic Communities and Organisations in Italy
- Hajji Baba Mondi, Dedebaba of Bektashism
- Bujar Spahiu, Grand Mufti of Albania

== Absences ==
=== Heads of state and government ===
The following heads of state and government were noted in media coverage for not attending the Requiem Mass:

Country	Person	Position	Reason for absence	Ref.
Australia	Anthony Albanese (Note: Attended the papal inauguration of Pope Leo XIV on 18 May)	Prime Minister of Australia	Ongoing election campaign	
Canada	Mark Carney	Prime Minister of Canada	Ongoing election campaign	
China	Xi Jinping	General Secretary of the Chinese Communist Party and President of China	No formal diplomatic relations with the Holy See	
Republic of the Congo	Denis Sassou Nguesso	President of the Republic of the Congo	Attended a Requiem Mass at the Basilica of Sainte-Anne-du-Congo in Brazzaville in Francis' honour	
Germany	Friedrich Merz	Chancellor–designate of Germany and Leader of the Opposition in the Bundestag	Undisclosed	
Israel	Benjamin Netanyahu	Prime Minister of Israel	Foreign travel limited by an International Criminal Court arrest warrant, poor bilateral relations between the Holy See and Israel amid the Gaza war	
Malawi	Lazarus Chakwera	President of Malawi	Attended a Requiem Mass at Maula Cathedral in Lilongwe in Francis' honour	
Mexico	Claudia Sheinbaum	President of Mexico	Cited risk of criticism of a potential visit to the Vatican due to the separation of church and state	
Netherlands	Willem-Alexander	King of the Netherlands	Celebrations of Koningsdag	
Paraguay	Santiago Peña	President of Paraguay	Visited the United States on the day of the funeral	
Peru	Dina Boluarte	President of Peru	Denied permission to attend by the Congress of the Republic of Peru	
Russia	Vladimir Putin	President of Russia	Foreign travel limited by an International Criminal Court arrest warrant	
United Kingdom	Charles III	King of the United Kingdom and the Commonwealth realms	British monarchs normally do not attend funerals of foreign heads of state; instead, other royals represent them. Charles (as Prince of Wales) attended the funeral of Pope John Paul II in 2005, representing Queen Elizabeth II.	

=== Eastern Catholic representatives ===
The following Eastern Catholic hierarchs were noted in media coverage for not attending the Supplicatio Ecclesiae Orientalium:

- Gregory III Laham, Patriarch Emeritus of Antioch and of All the East of the Melkite Greek Catholic Church, who did not travel due to his advanced age;
- Cardinal Lucian Mureșan, Major Archbishop of Făgăraș-Alba Iulia and Primate of the Romanian Greek Catholic Church, who did not travel due to his advanced age;
- Cardinal Bechara Boutros al-Rahi, Maronite Patriarch of Antioch, who issued a written farewell after having undergone surgery following an Easter liturgy during which he broke his hip;
- Menghesteab Tesfamariam, Metropolitan Archbishop of Asmara of the Eritrean Catholic Church, who was unable to attend due to Eritrea's strict travel policy.

=== Family members ===
Most immediate members of the Pope's family did not attend, including his sister, who was in poor health, niece Cristina Bergoglio, and other nieces, nephews, and their descendants. Some family members reportedly chose not to attend the funeral out of respect for his view that their resources would be better spent charitably.

== See also ==
- List of dignitaries at the funeral of Pope John Paul II
