= List of ambassadors to Cyprus =

This is a list of ambassadors to Cyprus. Note that some ambassadors are responsible for more than one country while others are directly accredited to Nicosia.

== Current Ambassadors to Nicosia ==
Sending country	Presentation of the credentials	Location of resident embassy	Ambassador
Afghanistan		Rome, Italy	Hadi Obaidullah Sader Khail (Chargé d'Affaires a.i.)
Albania		Athens, Greece	Savvas Kakos (Chargé d'Affaires a.i.)
Algeria	14.04.2022	Beirut, Lebanon	Abdelkrim Rekaibi
Andorra	16.11.2011	Andorra la Vella, Andorra	Gemma Cano Berné (Chargé d'Affaires a.i.)
Angola	20.12.2012	Athenes, Greece	Isabel Mercedes Da Silva Feijo
Argentina	29.10.2020	Tel Aviv, Israel	Sergio Daniel Urribari
Armenia	06.03.2018	Athens, Greece	Fadey Gharchoghlyan
Australia	31.03.2022	Nicosia, Cyprus	Fiona Vashti Catherine McKergow
Austria	27.08.2021	Nicosia, Cyprus	Dorothea Auer
Bahrain	16.06.2015	Cairo, Egypt	Sheikh Rashid bin Adbulrahman Al Khalifa
Bangladesh		Beirut, Lebanon	Jahangir Al Mustahidur Rahman
Barbados		London, UK	Milton Innis
Belarus	21.04.2022	Sofia, Bulgaria	Nikita Leshukov
Belgium	06.02.2020	Athens, Greece	Francoise Gustin
Belize		Nicosia, Cyprus	Chritsodoulos G. Vassiliades (Chargé d'Affaires a.i.)
Bolivia		Rome, Italy	vacant
Bosnia and Herzegovina	06.02.2020	Tel Aviv, Israel	Dusko Kovacevic
Botswana	02.02.2011	London, UK	Roy Warren Blackbeard
Brazil	08.10.2020	Nicosia, Cyprus	Eduardo Augusto Ibiapina de Seixas
Bulgaria		Nicosia, Cyprus	Lyubomir Todorov
Burkina Faso		Rome, Italy	Jean-Baptiste Kambire (Chargé d'Affaires a.i.)
Burundi	09.02.2026	Rome, Italy	Ernest Ndabashinze
Cambodia	07.05.2019	Paris, France	Dr. Widhya Chem
Cameroon		Nicosia, Cyprus	Dr. Charalambos C. Christofides (Chargé d'Affaires a.i.)
Canada	07.05.2019	Chalandri, Greece	Mark Allen
Cape Verde		Limassol, Cyprus	Peter Economides (Chargé d'Affaires a.i.)
Central African Republic		Nicosia, Cyprus	Sarkis Elias Sarkis (Chargé d'Affaires a.i.)
Chile	29.10.2020	Athens, Greece	Ximena Carolina Ares Mora
China	17.12.2020	Nicosia, Cyprus	Liu Yantao
Colombia	06.02.2020	Rome, Italy	Gloria Isabel Ramírez Ríos
DRC		Athens, Greece	Henri Benjamin Ntikala Booto (Chargé d'Affaires a.i.)
Costa Rica		Rome, Italy	vacant
Croatia	07.05.2019	Athens, Greece	Aleksandar Sunko
Cuba	07.02.2018	Nicosia, Cyprus	Omar Leyva Rafull
Czech Republic	16.02.2021	Nicosia, Cyprus	Vladimir Němec
Denmark	07.05.2019	Athens, Greece	Klavs Asnoldi Holm
Dominica		Nicosia, Cyprus	Athanasios Ktoridis (Chargé d'Affaires a.i.)
Dominican Republic		Tel Aviv, Israel	Rebecca Lagares (Chargé d'Affaires a.i.)
Ecuador	26.07.2018	Tel Aviv, Israel	María Gabriela Troya Rodríguez
Egypt	17.12.2020	Nicosia, Cyprus	Amr Mohsen Hamza
El Salvador	17.05.2020	Rome, Italy	Sandra Elizabeth Alas Guidos
Equatorial Guinea	20.21.2012	Rome, Italy	Cecilia Obono Ndong
Eritrea	18.02.2004	Moscow, Russia	Teklay Minassie Asgedom
Estonia	31.03.2022	Athens, Greece	Karin Rannu
Eswatini		London, UK	Christian Muzie Nkambule
Ethiopia	02.07.2019	Rome, Italy	Zenebu Tadesse Woldetsadik
Finland	05.11.2020	Nicosia, Cyprus	Haari Mäki-Reinikka
France	16.02.2021	Nicosia, Cyprus	Salina Grenet-Catalano
Gabon	27.09.2011	Rome, Italy	Charles Essonghe
The Gambia		Larnaca, Cyprus	Tryfonos Tryfonas (Chargé d'Affaires a.i.)
Georgia	05.11.2020	Nicosia, Cyprus	Temur Kekelidze
Germany	13.09.2011	Nicosia, Cyprus	Gabriela Guellil
Ghana	20.10.2010	Cairo, Egypt	Amin Amidu Sulemani
Greece	11.02.2009	Nicosia, Cyprus	Vassilis Papaioannou
Guatemala	27.03.2006	Tel Aviv, Israel	Moises Russ Topolsky
Guinea	20.12.2005	Cairo, Egypt	Elhadj Fode Cisse
Holy See	17.02.2023	Jerusalem	Giovanni Pietro Dal Toso
Honduras		Rome, Italy	vacant
Hungary	13.09.2011	Nicosia, Cyprus	Balázs Botos
Iceland	11.01.2012	Sofia, Bulgaria	Gunnar Gunnarsson
India	20.10.2009	Nicosia, Cyprus	Ashok Kumar
Indonesia	20.12.2012	Rome, Italy	August Perengkuan
Iran	07.09.2010	Nicosia, Cyprus	Aliakbar Rezaei
Iraq	10.01.2012	Athens, Greece	Burhan Jaf
Ireland	05.08.2010	Nicosia, Cyprus	Patrick Scullion
Israel	13.09.2010	Nicosia, Cyprus	Michael Harari
Italy	25.01.2013	Nicosia, Cyprus	Guido Cerboni
Jamaica	10.2004	Geneva, Switzerland	Cheryl Spencer (Chargé d’Affaires a.i.)
Japan	20.10.2010	Athens, Greece	Hiroshi Toda
Jordan	20.12.2012	Athens, Greece	Saker Malkawi
Kazakhstan	05.11.2021	Tel Aviv, Israel	Satybaldy Burshakov
Kenya	29.09.2011	Rome, Italy	Josephine Wangari Gaita
Kosovo	30.04.2010	Sofia, Bulgaria	Ariana Zherka-Hoxha
Kuwait	01.08.2011	Nicosia, Cyprus	Ahmad Salem Ahmad Al-Wehaib
Laos	29.09.2011	Geneva, Switzerland	Yong Chanthlangsy
Latvia		Athens, Greece	Ivars Pundurs (Ambassador Agréé)
Lebanon	16.06.2012	Nicosia, Cyprus	Claude Hajal (Ambassador Agréé)
Lesotho	09.03.2009	London, UK	Seeiso Bereng Seeiso
Libya	03.09.2012	Nicosia, Cyprus	Nureddin Ejledi (Chargé d’Affaires a.i.)
Lithuania		Athens, Greece	Dalia Ambrazeviciute (Chargé d’Affaires a.i.)
Luxembourg	20.12.2012	Athens, Greece	Christian Biever
Malawi		Paris, France	Ahmed Ismail Kharodia (Ambassador Agréé)
Malaysia	29.09.2011	Beirut, Lebanon	Ilango Karuppannan
Mali	02.11.2009	Cairo, Egypt	Moussa Diakité
Malta	10.01.2012	Valletta, Malta	Walter Balzan
Mauritania		Cairo, Egypt	vacant
Mexico	10.01.2012	Athens, Greece	Ricardo Tarcisio Navarrete-Montes de Oca
Moldova	29.09.2011	Athens, Greece	Mihai Balan
Mongolia	29.09.2011	Sofia, Bulgaria	Tserendorj Gankhuyang
Montenegro	20.10.2010	Athens, Greece	Ivo Armenko
Morocco	09.03.2009	Athens, Greece	Abdelkader El Ansari
Namibia	04.09.2007	London, UK	George Mbanga Liswaniso
Nepal	09.03.2009	Tel Aviv, Israel	Baija Nath Thapalia
Netherlands	30.06.2012	Nicosia, Cyprus	Hanno A. Wurzner (Chargé d´Affaires a. i.)
New Zealand	07.06.2011	Rome, Italy	Trevor Donald Matheson
Nicaragua	01.09.2002	Rome, Italy	Amelia Silva Csbrera (Chargé d´Affaires a. i.)
Nigeria	11.01.2012	Tel Aviv, Israel	David Oladipo Obasa
North Korea	14.01.2008	Rome, Italy	Han Tae Song
Norway	11.01.2012	Athens, Greece	Sjur Larsen
Oman	20.10.2010	Cairo, Egypt	Khalifa bin Al-Harthy
Pakistan	02.11.2009	Beirut, Lebanon	Raana Rahim
Palestine	07.06.2011	Nicosia, Cyprus	Walid Hasan
Panama	02.02.2011	Athens, Greece	Felicia Dushka Papadimitriu
Peru	11.01.2012	Rome, Italy	Cesar Castilo-Ramirez
Philippines	10.01.2012	Athens, Greece	Meynardo Montealegre
Poland	10.06.2009	Nicosia, Cyprus	Paweł Dobrowolski
Portugal	28.12.2011	Nicosia, Cyprus	Joao Bernardo Weinstein (Charge d' Affaires en pied)
Qatar	03.12.2007	Nicosia, Cyprus	Mubarak Al-Nasser
Romania	13.09.2011	Nicosia, Cyprus	Ion Pascu
Russia	31.10.2008	Nicosia, Cyprus	Stanislav Osadchiy
Rwanda		Brussels, Belgium	Faustin Musare (Charge d' Affaires en pied)
San Marino	08.02.2001	San Marino, San Marino	Maria Alessandra Albertini
Serbia	04.01.2010	Nicosia, Cyprus	Savo Djurica
Seychelles		London, UK	Patrick George Pillay (Ambassador Agréé)
Sierra Leone	06.05.2010	London, UK	Edward Mohamed Turay
Singapore	12.01.2009	Singapore, Singapore	Philip Eng Heng Nee
Slovakia	24.07.2007	Nicosia, Cyprus	Anna Turenièova
Slovenia	07.06.2011	Athens, Greece	Robert Basej
South Africa	29.09.2011	Athens, Greece	Sophonia Rapulane Makgetla
South Korea	25.01.2013	Athens, Greece	Gil-sou Shin
Sovereign Military Order of Malta	23.04.2007	Sofia, Bulgaria	Camillo Zuccoli
Spain	07.06.2011	Nicosia, Cyprus	Ana Maria Salomon Perez
Sri Lanka	10.01.2012	Rome, Italy	John Asitha Ivon Perera
Swaziland	08.2004	London, UK	Zwelethu Mnisi (Chargés d'Affaires a.i.)
Sweden	2022	Nicosia, Cyprus	Martin Hagström
Switzerland	25.04.2012	Nicosia, Cyprus	Gabriela Nützi Sulpizio
Syria	07.10.2010	Nicosia, Cyprus	Lamia al-Hariri (Chargés d'Affaires a.i.)
Thailand	02.02.2011	Rome, Italy	Somsakdi Suriyawongse
Tunisia	01.11.2009	Rome, Italy	Ridha Azaier (Chargés d'Affaires a.i.)
Uganda	02.02.2011	Rome, Italy	Deo Rwabita
Ukraine	25.04.2012	Nicosia, Cyprus	Borys Humeniuk
United Arab Emirates		Beirut, Lebanon	vacant
United Kingdom	14.09.2022	Nicosia, Cyprus	Irfan Siddiq
United States	21.02.2023	Nicosia, Cyprus	Julie D. Fisher
Uruguay	03.12.2007	Beirut, Lebanon	Jorge Luis Jure Arnoletti
Uzbekistan		Athenes, Greece	vacant
Venezuela	10.06.2009	Nicosia, Cyprus	Angel Rafael Tortolero
Vietnam	20.12.2012	Rome, Italy	Nguyen Hoang Long
Zambia	10.01.2005	London, UK	Anderson Kaseba Chibwa

== See also ==
- Foreign relations of Cyprus
- List of diplomatic missions of Cyprus
- List of diplomatic missions in Cyprus
