= Maggie Swinson =

British accountant and Anglican lay leader

Canon Maggie Swinson OBE
- Education: University of Liverpool
- Occupation: Chartered accountant
- Office: Chair of the Anglican Consultative Council
- Term: Since 2023
- Predecessor: Paul Kwong
- Board member of: Christian Aid, Liverpool Hope University
- Mother: Pamela Ball

Margaret Anne Swinson (née Ball) is a British accountant and Anglican lay leader. Since 2023, she has been the chair of the Anglican Consultative Council, the governing body of the Anglican Communion. She previously was vice chair of the council and has been involved in lay governance in the Communion and in the Church of England for decades.

== Early life ==
Swinson is one of three children of John Ball, a general practitioner, and Pamela Ball, a surgeon who was the daughter of Jamaican physician Ludlow Moody and niece of Jamaican Premier Norman Manley. Pamela Ball was the first Jamaican woman named a Fellow of the Royal Colleges of Surgeons and was late in life named a Member of the Order of the British Empire. Through her Caribbean ancestry, Swinson is a descendant of chattel slaves.

Swinson received a degree in music at the University of Liverpool.

== Professional career ==
Swinson is a qualified chartered accountant. She is company secretary of Primary Care 24 (Merseyside) Limited (widely known as PC24 which is not a legal entity and Primary Care 24 Limited which was recently a dormant company and was formerly known as UC24 or Urgent Care 24) and has been a non-executive director for two National Health Service trusts, a governor of Liverpool Hope University and vice chair of the charity Christian Aid.

== Anglican governance ==
Swinson has been involved in Anglican lay governance for more than 40 years. She was a member of the General Synod of the Church of England from 1985 until 2021, where she was involved in efforts to ordain women as bishops.

Swinson joined the Anglican Consultative Council, which governs the worldwide Anglican Communion, in 2012. She was elected vice chair of the ACC at its meeting in Zambia in 2016. In this capacity, she chaired the Inter-Anglican Finance and Administration Committee. She also led the panel that selected Anthony Poggo as Secretary General of the Anglican Communion. Seven years later, during the ACC's meeting in Accra, she was elected chair without opposition. Upon her election, she said her priorities would be maintaining the voices of laity and non-bishop clergy in the council, improving financial stability and attempting to find ways for provinces to remain in the Communion despite their differences. She was part of the Anglican delegation to the inauguration of Pope Leo XIV in 2025.

Swinson is a lay canon of Liverpool Cathedral. She was formally inducted as ACC chair in a 2023 service at the cathedral. In the 2026 Birthday Honours, Swinson was named an Officer of the Order of the British Empire for her services to the Church of England.

Since 2022, Swinson has been the independent reviewer monitoring the implementation of the CofE bishops' declaration that governs arrangements made for CofE parishes that cannot for reasons of theological conviction receive the ministry of women bishops. As independent reviewer, she called for additional resources for two provincial episcopal visitors, the Bishop of Ebbsfleet and the Bishop of Beverley. She noted that Bishop of Ebbsfleet Rob Munro oversees 152 conservative evangelical parishes with 25,000 people in attendance, a total larger than many CofE dioceses, and with Munro as the only CofE bishop holding a complementarian view, Swinson noted that he has no one to deputise for him should be unavailable. After complaints made by Women and the Church, Swinson conducted an independent review of the appointment of Philip North as Bishop of Blackburn and found that it had followed proper processes; however, Swinson suggested future improvements.

== Personal life ==
In 1981, she married architect Michael Swinson, whom she met through the Anglican student ministry at the University of Liverpool.

She is a member of and lay leader at the Church of St Matthew and St James, Mossley Hill in Liverpool. Swinson has also been a singer in the Royal Liverpool Philharmonic Choir.

Anglican Communion titles
Preceded by Paul Kwong	Chair of the Anglican Consultative Council; Since 2023	Incumbent
