= Songbun =

System of ascribed status in North Korea

- Chulsin sŏngbun
- Diagram of the Songbun system as described by the Committee for Human Rights in North Korea

Chulsin sŏngbun
- Hangul: 출신성분
- Hanja: 出身成分
- RR: chulsin seongbun
- MR: ch'ulsin sŏngbun

Songbun (Korean: 성분), formally chulsin-songbun (Korean: 출신성분, from Sino-Korean 出身, "origin" and 成分, "constituent"), is the alleged system of ascribed status used in North Korea. According to the U.S. Committee for Human Rights in North Korea and the American Enterprise Institute, it is based on the political, social, and economic background of one's direct ancestors as well as the behavior of their relatives; according to the North Korean secret police, songbun is used to classify North Korean citizens into three primary castes—core, wavering, and hostile—in addition to approximately fifty sub-classifications, and determine whether an individual is trusted with responsibilities, is given opportunities within North Korea, or even receives adequate food. The U.S. Committee for Human Rights in North Korea and the American Enterprise Institute state that songbun affects access to educational and employment opportunities and it particularly determines whether a person is eligible to join North Korea's ruling party, the Workers' Party of Korea. The DPRK itself, however, proclaims that all citizens are equal and denies any discrimination based on family background.

== Description ==
According to the U.S. Committee for Human Rights in North Korea, being based on the Resident Registration Project of 1967–1970, there are three main classifications and about 50 sub-classifications. They include:

1. Core Class (핵심 계층 / 核心階層) – 12 categories:

- Public officials
- Teachers
- Tenant farmers
- Korean People's Army personnel as of 1953 and their descendants
- Workers' Party of Korea members as of 1953 and their descendants
- Office workers
- Revolutionary family members as of 1953 and their descendants
- Patriotic martyr family members as of 1953 and their descendants
- Families of those killed (victims) as of 1953 and their descendants
- Families of fallen soldiers as of 1953 and their descendants
- Families of rear-area contributors as of 1953 and their descendants.

2. Wavering Class (동요 계층 / 動搖階層) – 18 categories:

- Small and medium merchants as of 1948
- Artisans as of 1948
- Farmers as of 1948
- Laborers as of 1948
- Wealthy farmers as of 1948
- Small and medium landlords as of 1953 and their descendants
- Korean residents in Japan who remigrated.

3. Hostile Class (적대 계층 / 敵對階層) – 21 categories:

- Large landlords as of 1948 and their descendants
- Capitalists as of 1948 and their descendants
- Pro-Japanese collaborators as of 1948 and their descendants
- Reactionaries as of 1948 and their descendants
- Chondoist Party members as of 1948 and their descendants
- People who entered North Korea from the South
- Protestant, Buddhist, and Catholic believers as of 1948 and their descendants
- Party defectors
- Philosophers as of 1948 and their descendants
- Persons who served in enemy organizations
- Families of detainees and prisoners
- Persons related to spies
- Anti-Party and anti-revolutionary sectarians
- Families of those executed
- Released prisoners
- Political prisoners
- Members of the Korean Democratic Party.

According to former CIA analyst Helen-Louise Hunter, those with a landlord, merchant, lawyer, or Christian minister in their background are given very low status. The highest status is accorded to those descended from participants in the resistance against Japanese occupation during and before World War II and to those who were factory workers, laborers, or peasants as of 1950. B. R. Myers, associate professor of international studies at Dongseo University in Busan, South Korea, summarizes the core (haeksim) class as consisting of "high-ranking party cadres and their families". The wavering (dongyo) class is reserved for average North Koreans, whereas the hostile (choktae) class is made of possible subversive elements (e.g. former landowners). According to Hunter, the Communists were highly successful in turning the pre-revolutionary social structure upside down, and songbun is reflective of that. In her view, the "preferred class" consists of 30% of the population, the "ordinary people" make up the middle 40%, and "undesirables" make up the bottom 30%.

Files are maintained on every North Korean by security officials and party cadres from age 17 and updated every two years. In general, songbun is difficult to improve, but it can be downgraded for a variety of reasons such as a lack of political enthusiasm, marrying someone of lower standing, or being convicted—or having a family member convicted—of a crime, political or otherwise. Before the late 1960s, it was possible to conceal that a relative had bad songbun; however, the ancestry of all citizens was thoroughly checked starting with a 1966 census. These investigations have been suggested to have been a response to the Chinese Cultural Revolution which began in 1966. Kim Il Sung, afraid that Beijing would also interfere in his country, whether by invading or sponsoring a coup d'état (Chinese soldiers had been sent previously on "provocative incursions" into Korea), aimed to increase internal security by classifying his citizens. These investigations were repeated several times in subsequent years, for reasons varying from suspected corruption in previous checks to weeding out possible opposition.

U.S. journalist Barbara Demick describes this "class structure" as an updating of the hereditary "caste system", combining Confucianism and Stalinism. She claims that a bad family background is called "tainted blood", and that by law this "tainted blood" lasts for three generations. She asserts, however, that North Koreans are not told of their classification, and that children can grow up without knowing about their family status. Similarly, Hunter describes songbun as "class background" and says that it is not officially published or precisely defined.

The North Korean government, on the contrary, proclaims that all citizens are equal and denies any discrimination based on family background.

== Importance ==
Under Kim Il-sung, songbun was very important, it decided everything. Under Kim Jong-il, things are different—your family background still matters, but money nowadays is more important than social background.

— Description of songbun by a North Korean refugee born in the mid-1960s.

Since the collapse of the Eastern Bloc in the late 1980s and early 1990s, the importance of songbun has decreased. Before the collapse, the North Korean economy was heavily subsidized by the bloc. Through these funds, the government was able to provide all material goods, so income could only be derived by working in industry or the bureaucracy. As a result, one's ability to obtain goods from the distribution system, where one could live, what career was pursued, or how much one could advance in society depended solely on their songbun, which made it the "single-most important factor that determined the life of a North Korean". Before the centralized system's collapse, the government had "near-complete control of an individual's life"; therefore, the only way to increase one's status or affluence was by advancing through the bureaucracy.

During the 1994 to 1998 North Korean famine itself—when up to 2.5 million died—the songbun system "often determined who ate and who starved", according to Brian Hook.

As the centralized system collapsed, the importance of songbun decreased. To survive, capitalism was "rediscovered", and the average North Korean now derives most of his or her income through private enterprise. When these private markets started, it was instead more advantageous to be part of the hostile class, because they were not as dependent on the government as were those with better songbun. Military service has decreased in popularity; previously, after seven to ten years of service, a North Korean man could hope to become a low-level bureaucrat, but nowadays it is more profitable to engage in private enterprise. Songbun remains important to members of the government elite, but for the majority of North Koreans, wealth has become more important than songbun when defining one's place in society.

A prominent example of songbun involves Ko Yong-hui, the mother of present leader Kim Jong Un. Ko was born in Osaka, Japan, which would make her part of the hostile class because of her Korean-Japanese heritage; furthermore, her grandfather worked in a sewing factory for the Imperial Japanese Army. Before an internal propaganda film was released, after the ascension of Kim Jong Un, there were three attempts made to idolize Ko, in a style similar to that associated with Kang Pan-sŏk, mother of Kim Il Sung, and Kim Jong-suk, mother of Kim Jong Il and the first wife of Kim Il Sung. These previous attempts at idolization had failed, and they were stopped after Kim Jong Il's 2008 stroke. The building of a cult of personality around Ko encounters the problem of her bad songbun, as making her identity public would undermine the Kim dynasty's pure bloodline. Ko's real name or other personal details have not been publicly revealed (her origins could be figured out, as she worked with Mansudae Art Troupe in Pyongyang), so she is referred to as "Mother of Korea" or "Great Mother", and the most recent propaganda film called its main character "Lee Eun-mi". The complications of Ko's songbun were such that after Kim Jong Il's death, her personal information, including name, became state secrets. While songbun is usually passed from the father, Ko's background has the "lowest imaginable status qualities" for a North Korean.

== Reactions ==
In 2014, North Korean ambassador to the United Nations, Jang Il Hun, was asked about his own songbun by a journalist during a meeting on human rights in North Korea, refusing to take the question. During the meeting he reaffirmed that "equality is the main principle of [North Korean] society".

In 2017, Jang Il Hun publicly addressed the songbun system during an UN meeting, stating that it "does not exist at all" and was a "fabrication" created to smear North Korea.

During another meeting in 2019, several representatives present called for North Korea to end all forms of discrimination, including songbun. DPRK ambassador Tae Song Han denied that songbun was practiced in North Korea, and stated that "domestic legislation provide[s] for the principles of equality and non-discrimination".

== See also ==
- Yan'an faction
- Caste
- New People
- Bone-rank system – ancient Korean Silla social system based on bloodlines
- Five Black Categories, Five Red Categories – Chinese revolutionary classifications during Mao era
- Lishenets – Soviet revolutionary classifications during Lenin/Stalin eras

== Notes ==
=== Works cited ===
- Demick, Barbara (2010). Nothing to Envy: Love, Life and Death in North Korea. London: Fourth Estate.
- Hunter, Helen-Louise (1999). Kim Il-song's North Korea. Westport, CT: Praeger. ISBN 0-275-96296-2.
