= Teklay Minassie Asgedom =

Eritrean diplomat

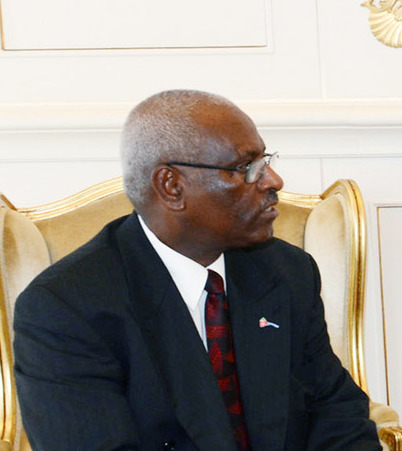
Teklay Minassie Asgedom, 2012

Teklay Minassie Asgedom is an Eritrean diplomat and is the current ambassador of Eritrea to Russia, presenting his credentials to Russian president Vladimir Putin on 16 April 2003. Ambassador of Eritrea to Ukraine (2004–2014), presenting his credentials to Ukrainian president Leonid Kuchma on 21 October 2004. Ambassador of Eritrea to Belarus, Cyprus, Bulgaria (2004–2014). Ambassador of Eritrea to Azerbaijan (2012–2014), presenting his credentials to Azerbaijan President Ilham Aliyev on 1 December 2012.

He paid a visit to the Russian-occupied Crimea on 5–6 June 2014. The Ukrainian Ministry of Foreign Affairs considered this an "unfriendly step, blatant disregard of international law by Eritrean side as well as a flagrant violation of Ukrainian sovereignty and domestic law" and warned that it "may have deeply negative effect on further development of Ukrainian - Eritrean relations."
