= Pamela Ball =

British surgeon (1926–2019)

Pamela Ball MBE FRCS
- Born: Pamela Margaret Moody; 28 November 1926; Kingston, Jamaica
- Died: 16 September 2019 (aged 92)
- Education: University of Birmingham, Open University
- Occupation: Surgeon
- Years active: 1950–1991
- Known for: First Jamaican woman to become a fellow of the Royal College of Surgeons of England; hospital fundraising
- Children: 3 (including Maggie Swinson)
- Father: Ludlow Moody
- Medical career
- Field: Orthopaedics, anaesthetics, plastic surgery
- Institutions: Kidderminster Hospital

Pamela Margaret Ball, (née Moody; 28 November 1926 – 16 September 2019) was a British surgeon. She was the first Jamaican woman to be named a fellow of the Royal College of Surgeons of England, in 1954. After her retirement in 1991, she became an active fundraiser for Kidderminster Hospital, where she had spent most of her career, and served as president of the League of Hospital Friends. For her fundraising work, she was named a member of the Order of the British Empire in the 2019 Birthday Honours shortly before her death at age 92.

== Early life and training ==
Ball was born in 1926 in the Half Way Tree area of Kingston, Jamaica to Ludlow Moody, a general practitioner and the first Jamaican to become a member of the Royal College of Physicians, and Vera Holme Moody, sister of Jamaican statesman Norman Manley. Ball's paternal uncles included Jamaican physician Harold Moody and sculptor Ronald Moody.

Ball migrated to England during World War II. She qualified in medicine at the University of Birmingham in 1950. She was initially a house surgeon at Birmingham General Hospital. In 1954, she became the first Jamaican woman to be named a fellow of the Royal College of Surgeons of England.

== Surgical practice ==
Ball became a resident surgical officer at Kidderminster Hospital in Worcestershire, where she worked until her retirement. In addition to her work at Kidderminster, she also provided anaesthetics for plastic surgery and obstetrics in other area clinics and led Kidderminster's accident unit.

While at Kidderminster, she met and married general practitioner John Ball in 1957. They lived in Bewdley and had three children, including Maggie Swinson, who became an accountant and Anglican lay leader. In addition to her other surgical work, Pamela Ball performed minor operations in her husband's general practice. While working in surgery, Ball also received first-class honours and a master's degree in mathematics from the Open University which she considered her greatest achievement, because she had done this in parallel with her other work.

== Later life ==
Ball retired from Kidderminster in 1991, although she remained active as a locum for a number of years. She also became active as a charitable fundraiser for Kidderminster Hospital and served as president of the League of Hospital Friends. In this capacity, she helped raise funds for modernised equipment and facilities and campaigned against downgrades in services. She was awarded an MBE in the 2019 Queen's Birthday Honours for services to charitable fundraising.

For recreation, Ball played the viola, gardened and fished for salmon. She died of bone cancer in September 2019.
