= Josiah Idowu-Fearon =

Anglican bishop in Nigeria

The Right Reverend Josiah Idowu-Fearon
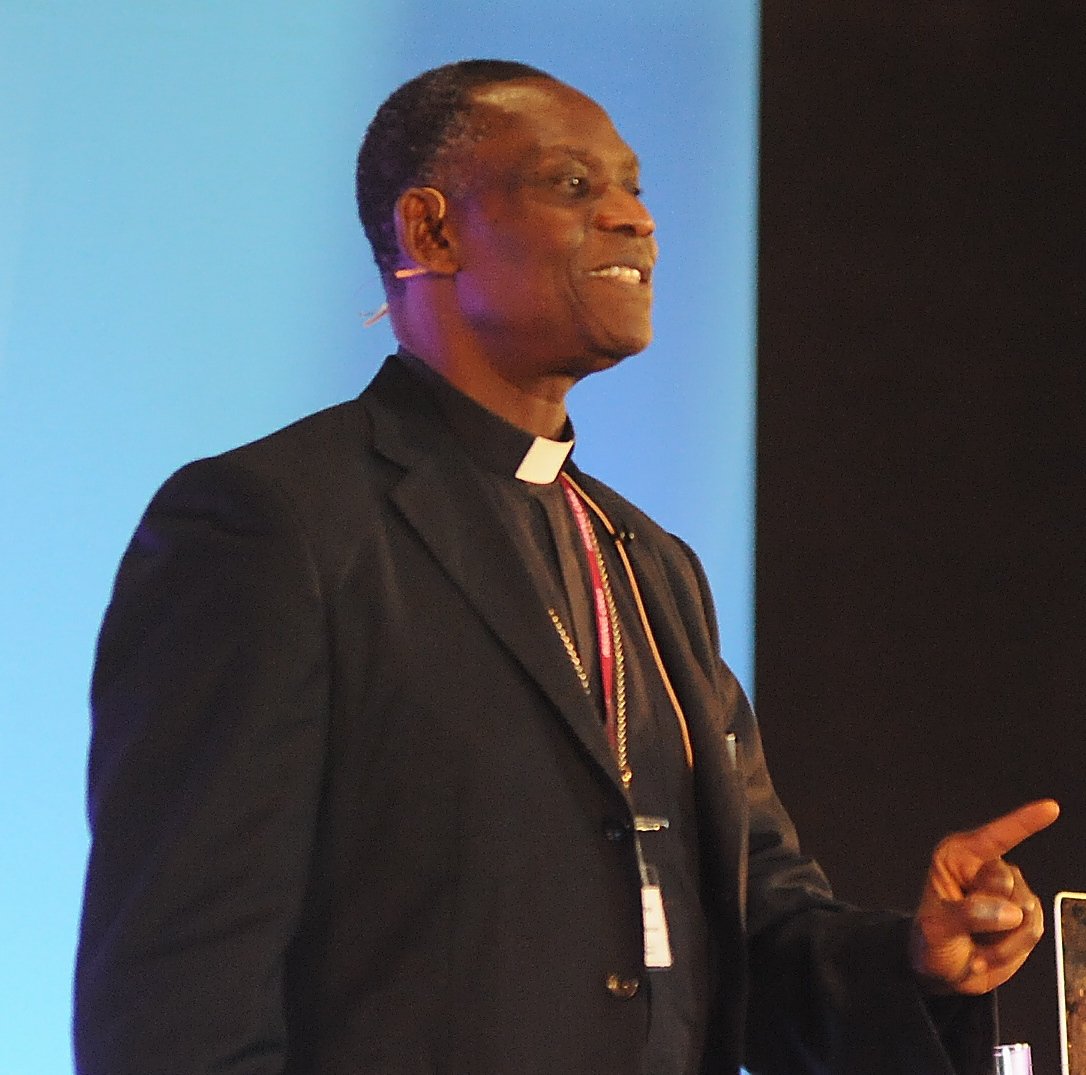
- Idowu-Fearon in 2015
- In office: 2015-2022
- Predecessor: Kenneth Kearon
- Other posts: Secretary General of the Anglican Communion (2015-2022); Archbishop of Kaduna (2002–2008); Bishop of Kaduna (1998–2015); Bishop of Sokoto (1990–1998)

Orders
- Ordination: 1971
- Consecration: 29 April 1990 by Joseph Abiodun Adetiloye

Personal details
- Born: Josiah Atkins Idowu-Fearon; 17 January 1949 (age 77) Kerinye, Kogi State, Nigeria
- Denomination: Anglicanism
- Spouse: Comfort Amina
- Children: Three
- Education: Immanuel Theological College, Ibadan, Nigeria; St John's College, Durham University, UK; Birmingham University, UK; Ahmadu Bello University, Nigeria; Hartford Seminary, USA; University of Jordan, Jordan

Josiah Atkins Idowu-Fearon (born 17 January 1949) is a Nigerian Anglican bishop. From 2015 until 2022, he was Secretary General of the Anglican Consultative Council. He was previously the Bishop of Kaduna diocese and the Archbishop of the province of Kaduna in the Church of Nigeria.

== Early life ==
Josiah Idowu-Fearon was born in Kerinye, Kogi State on 17 January 1949.

== Family ==
Idowu-Fearon is married to Comfort Amina; they had two sons, Ibrahim and Dauda, and a daughter Ninma. Dauda died at age 24 from meningitis while studying in Bristol as a medical student.

Comfort Amina Idowu-Fearon served as diocesan president, Mothers' Union, Women's Guild & Girls' Guild during Idowu-Fearon's tenure as bishop of Kaduna.

== Military aspirations ==
Idowu-Fearon trained briefly as a soldier before he changed to theological training for the priesthood. He describes the change this way. "I came to Christ at the Nigeria Military School, Zaria in my second year (1964)" and two years later (1966) the Lord called "me to be a soldier in His Army." Idowu-Fearon was given a 'sympathetic' discharge by late General Hassan Katsina in Lagos so that he could begin training for the priesthood.

== Education ==
Idowu-Fearon is noted as "a strong intellectual inquirer and student." He has "a higher education than most bishops, both within Africa and throughout the [Anglican Communion]." He groups his overseas undergraduate and graduate study as the four years in the United Kingdom (1976–1981) and the three years in the United States (1990–1993). His studies in Nigeria occurred before 1976 and in the 1980s.

After his decision to become an Anglican priest, Idowu-Fearon enrolled in Immanuel Theological College, Ibadan. It was there that he was introduced to the "World of Islam," an introduction that eventually became his "passion for the Muslim as a potential child of God by adoption."

In 1976, Idowu-Fearon went to St. John's College, University of Durham in the UK for an "Honours class in Theology" that included "in-depth course on Islamic Civilisation". He graduated with a Bachelors in Theology.

After receiving his theology degree from the University of Durham, Idowu-Fearon went on to earn a master's degree in Islamic Studies and Muslim-Christian relations at Birmingham University. At Birmingham Idowu-Fearon read "Islam, And Christian-Muslim Relations" and wrote "a major paper on 'The Status of a Non-Muslim (thumma) In an Islamic State'". It was then, he says, "I knew the Lord was calling me [to be] a bridge builder."

After his studies in the United Kingdom, Idowu-Fearon continued his studies in Nigeria with a second master's degree in sociology from Nigeria's Ahmadu Bello University, Zaria. This was followed with a PhD in sociology and a Postgraduate Diploma in Education from Ahmadu Bello University. Later, as a bishop, Idowu-Fearon served as a research fellow at the Ahmadu Bello University in the field of "determining the influence of politics and religion on development".

In 1993, Idowu-Fearon received a D.Min. from the Hartford Seminary in Hartford, CT, USA.

In 2002, Idowu-Fearon received masters and doctors degrees in Arabic and Islamic studies with special interest in Christian-Muslim relations from the University of Jordan.

== Ecclesiastical career in Nigeria ==
In 1971, Idowu-Fearon was ordained as a priest of the Anglican church and nineteen years later he was made a bishop.

From his ordination to the priesthood in 1971 to 1990 when he was consecrated bishop of the Diocese of Sokoto, Idowu-Fearon worked as the General Secretary for the Evangelical Fellowship of the Anglican Communion for Nigeria, and concurrently held the post of Warden of St. Francis Theological College, Wusasa from 1981 to 1984, when he became the Provost of St. Michael's Cathedral.

=== Bishop of Sokoto ===
On 29 April 1990 at St Michael's Cathedral, Kaduna, Idowu-Fearon was consecrated as a bishop by Joseph Abiodun Adetiloye, Archbishop of Nigeria, to serve as the first Bishop of Sokoto (the ordinary of the Diocese of Sokoto), where he remained until 1998. During that time, he served as Warden at St Francis of Assisi Theological College in Wusasa and Provost of St. Michael's Cathedral in Kaduna.

After his consecration in 1990, Idowu-Fearon served as a founding member of the Compass Rose Society, as a founding member and one of the first three Presidents of the NIFCON (Network for Interfaith Concerns), as a member of a 13-Member Committee of the Archbishop of Canterbury that looked into the responses to Lambeth Resolution 1:10 of 1998, and on the Committee that produced the Windsor Commission Report of 2003.

=== Bishop of Kaduna ===
Idowu-Fearon was unanimously elected the fourth Bishop of the Diocese of Kaduna in 1998. He remained in that position until he resigned to begin his work as Secretary General of the Anglican Consultative Council in 2015.

As Bishop of Kaduna, Idowu-Fearon co-founded the Centre for the Study of Islam and Christianity. He also served as Director of the Kaduna Anglican Study Centre. and as area leader for the Programme for Christian-Muslim Relations in Africa (PROCMURA).

Beyond his diocese, Idowu-Fearon served as president of the Anglican Network for Inter Faith Concerns (NIFCON) and as a member of NIFCON's Management Group. He also served on the International Anglican Conversations on Human Sexuality appointed by former Archbishop of Canterbury George Carey following the 1998 Lambeth Conference of bishops.

In 2002, Idowu-Fearon was unanimously elected for a seven-year term as the first archbishop of the newly created Ecclesiastical province of Kaduna in Owerri. However, his "closeness to the Muslim community in Nigeria" resulted in his being not elected for a second term.

Idowu-Fearon served on the 2003–04 Lambeth Commission on Communion, "which considered worldwide Anglican unity in response to divisive debates on homosexuality". In 2004, he was selected as a panelist on "an October 2004 public discussion in London, sponsored by the Pew Research Center's Forum on Religion and Public Life, dealing with issues affecting the Anglican Communion." In 2005, he was chosen as a member of the third "Building Bridges" seminar held at Georgetown University in Washington DC.

Idowu-Fearon is an adjunct "Professor of Christian/Muslim Relations" at Wycliffe College of the University of Toronto, Canada.

=== Six Preacher in Canterbury Cathedral ===
Idowu-Fearon was installed as a Six Preacher (a preaching priest) on 26 July 2007 by the Archbishop of Canterbury, the Most Revd Rowan Williams, and the Very Revd Robert Willis, the Dean of Canterbury. He previously taught at the cathedral's International Study Centre.

Idowu-Fearon attended the 2009 Georgetown University-sponsored conference "A Common Word Between Us and You: A Global Agenda for Change."

=== Anglican Cross of St Augustine ===
Idowu-Fearon was presented the Cross of St Augustine by Justin Welby, Archbishop of Canterbury at Lambeth Palace in London on 20 June 2013. (The Cross of St Augustine award is presented to people who have given long and exceptionally distinguished service to the Anglican Communion.) Welby highlighted Idowu-Fearon's "pivotal role in advancing understanding between Christians and Muslims in Nigeria in an effort to stem the cycle of violence and misunderstanding" and his work in the Tony Blair Faith Foundation.

=== Christian-Muslim dialogue ===
As a bishop in Nigeria, Idowu-Fearon was a proponent of Christian-Muslim dialogue.

An article in the Nigerian newspaper Daily Trust about Idowu-Fearon noted that his ability to combine "dedication to his Christianity with genuine respect for Islam as a religion" made him suitable for his "role of being the midwife of peace and understanding" between Christians and Muslims. The article described Idowu-Fearon as being committed to "bridge-building" and "interfaith dialogue". As such, he is accused of being a "Muslim Bishop by the detractors" and "Mr. Dialogue by admirers".

Idowu-Fearon views his commitment to bridge-building and interfaith dialogue as a call from his Lord. "A Muslim is not someone to hate," he says, "but rather someone to love".

Acting on his bridge-building commitment, Idowu-Fearon co-founded the Centre for the Study of Islam and Christianity at Kaduna.

=== Working together in violent conflict ===
In 2000, two years after Josiah Idowu-Fearon became bishop of the Diocese of Kaduna, the city and state of Kaduna became "embroiled in communal violence." In the city, "churches, mosques, homes and businesses" were burnt, with 80,000 people were made homeless, and hundreds killed. "Our people are being shot, butchered and roasted", said Bishop Josiah. The violence was primarily "inter-religious" between Muslims and Christians. In this crisis, Bishop Josiah's knowledge of Islam and his years of reaching out to Muslims came into play. The Bishop and Imam Asafa, a local Muslim cleric, "called on people not just to tolerate each other, but to be prepared to rebuild together" and "announced plans for joint Muslim/Christian projects to rebuild the city".

=== Boko Haram and the Islamic State of Iraq and Syria (ISIS) ===
Regarding the current violent conflict with Boko Haram and Islamic State of Iraq and Syria (ISIS). Idowu-Fearon holds that in ISIS or Boko Haram "religion is a facade. What these guys want is power. They know through a democratic process they will never ever get power, so [they] latch onto religion."

=== Reflections on his bridge building ===
In 2015, as he was leaving Nigeria to assume his work as Secretary General of the Anglican Consultative Council, Idowu-Fearon reflected on his relations with Muslims in Nigeria: "I have spent the last 25 years as bishop [first of Sokoto, then Kaduna] trying to build bridges of understanding between two different communities. We are theologically and doctrinally different, and yet we've been able to work together."

=== Other positions and honours ===
Before leaving Nigeria in 2015 for London, UK, as Secretary General of the Anglican Consultative Council, Idowu-Fearon held several extra-ecclesiastical positions:

- Chairman of Bridge Builders Association of Nigeria
- Member of the Nigerian Inter-Religious Council (NIREC)
- member of the State Religious Harmony Council
- Nigeria North Area Committee Chairperson for the Programme for Christian-Muslim Relations in Africa (PROCMURA)

Idowu-Fearon is permanently an Officer of the Order of the Niger.

== Secretary General of the Anglican Consultative Council ==
In April 2015, Idowu-Fearon was appointed as the seventh Secretary General of the Anglican Consultative Council, in London, UK. He was commissioned into the role on 4 September 2015 by Justin Welby, Archbishop of Canterbury, at the Anglican Communion Office in London.

President Muhammadu Buhari of Nigeria wrote this to Idowu-Fearon: "With your intellect, with great pastoral zeal and with compassion, you have over the years risen above intolerance and narrow sectarianism and built interfaith and ecumenical bridges of understanding among your countrymen."

The Ven. Tom Furrer, rector of Trinity Episcopal Church, Tariffville, CT has worked with Idowu-Fearon for 15 years. "He loves our Lord Jesus Christ and he loves the Body of Christ on earth. He will do everything he can to build bridges and heal our wounds."

In contrast to such endorsements of Idowu-Fearon's appointment, the official response of the Church of Nigeria was negative. Regarding Idowu-Fearon's assertion that he had "never supported the law in Nigeria that criminalizes the gay community," the official response was that this assertion "clearly indicates that he is not in accord with the theological and doctrinal posture of the Church of Nigeria". Therefore, the official response continued, "his acceptance of the post of ACC General Secretary neither received the approval of the Church of Nigeria, nor does it in any way affect the Church of Nigeria's theological posture on the issues of homosexuality and gay movement."

Idowu-Fearon has announced that he is to resign at the end of his seven-year term, at the end of August 2022.

=== Intra-Anglican Communion relations ===
After becoming Secretary General of the Anglican Consultative Council, Idowu-Fearon said, "My prayer to God is very simple, that I would be able to be a bridge builder; to create the culture of respect for differences, a culture of accepting people as human beings and loving them for who they are in Christ. If within the Communion, we have this understanding, we can live together with our differences." As a bridge builder, Idowu-Fearon said that his "ministry is to help Africa understand Europe and Europe to understand Africa."

=== Opposition to both active homosexuality and its criminalization ===
Idowu-Fearon in an interview for BBC on 9 August 2015 affirmed the Resolution 1.10 adopted by the Lambeth Conference in 1998. Reso 1.10 that stated, "in view of the teaching of Scripture we uphold faithfulness in marriage between a man and a woman in life-long union and believe that abstinence is right for those who are not called to marriage." Therefore, he opposes the pro-homosexuality position of some churches in the Anglican Communion. At the same time, he opposes the support for the criminalization of homosexuality by several African churches, like the Church of Nigeria. While he opposes sexually active same-sex relationships, he supports the ordination of homosexual clergy if they are celibate, including in celibate partnerships, and he stated that sexual orientation itself should not be a barrier to ordained ministry.

In another interview, Idowu-Fearon said that if Resolution 1.10 were withdrawn, "he would have to resign".

In 1998, after passage of Lambeth Conference's Resolution 1.10, aimed in part at the Episcopal Church in the United States, Idowu-Fearon said "it has been very good to meet the bishops" of the Episcopal Church. "It is also essential to heal perceived divisions between different regions of the Communion," he said. "The South needs the North, and the North needs the South" and "we agreed to extend the right hand of fellowship to those in different cultures. We've got to listen to each other."

=== Criticism of GAFCON ===
Idowu-Fearon has been highly critical of the Global Anglican Future Conference for the role he believes its playing in the current divisions in the Anglican Communion. He has stated that GAFCON was "not a movement of the Holy Spirit, because it is divisive".

== Lectures and writings ==
Fearon-Idowa has "lectured and been published widely on the subject of Christian-Muslim relations."

=== Lectures ===
- "Nigeria: Rise of the Muslim Bishop"

=== Writings ===
- "The Status of a Non-Muslim (thumma) In an Islamic State"
- Reconciling a religiously-divided community through inter-faith dialogue: an experiment in Wusasa-Zaria of Nigeria (D. Min. Dissertation, Hartford Seminary, 1992)
- "Conflict and Cooperation between Christians and Muslims in Nigeria," 16 February 2005
- "Interfaith Relations and Community Development: How Feasible? What Are the Obstacles? How Do We Surmount Them?", 22–24 January 2009.
