= List of ambassadors to Bulgaria =

This is a list of ambassadors to Bulgaria. Note that some ambassadors are responsible for more than one country while others are directly accredited to Sofia.

== Current ambassadors to Sofia ==
Sending country	Presentation of the credentials	Location of resident embassy	Ambassador
Islamic Republic of Afghanistan		Sofia, Bulgaria	Mohammad Fazel Saifi (Chargé d'Affaires a.i.)
Albania	31.01.2024	Sofia, Bulgaria	Inid Milo
Algeria	25.07.2023	Sofia, Bulgaria	Messaoud Mehila
Andorra	22.11.2023	Andorra la Vella, Andorra	Gemma Cano Berné
Angola		Belgrade, Serbia	Fernanda Maria F. A. M. dos Reis Baptista (Chargé d'Affaires a.i.)
Argentina		Sofia, Bulgaria	Daniel Horacio Cottini (Chargé d'Affaires a.i.)
Armenia	23.09.2020	Sofia, Bulgaria	Armen Yedigarian
Australia	13.10.2023	Athenes, Greece	Alison Joy Duncan
Austria	10.10.2022	Sofia, Bulgaria	Andrea Ikic-Böhm
Azerbaijan	28.07.2021	Sofia, Bulgaria	Huseyn Huseynov
Bangladesh	11.10.2021	Bucharest, Romania	Md Daud Ali
Bahrain	02.04.2019	Berlin, Germany	Abdulla Abdullatif Abdulla
Belarus		Sofia, Bulgaria	Nikita Leshukov (Chargé d'Affaires a.i.)
Belgium	23.09.2020	Sofia, Bulgaria	Frédéric Meurice
Benin	26.09.2018	Geneva, Switzerland	Eloi Laourou
Bosnia and Herzegovina	15.02.2024	Sofia, Bulgaria	Aleksandra Mićić
Brazil	31.01.2024	Sofia, Bulgaria	Paulo Roberto Campos Tarrisse da Fontoura
Burkina Faso		Rome, Italy	vacant
Burundi		Moscow, Russia	Major General Joseph Nkurunziza
Cambodia	17.12.2021	Sofia, Bulgaria	Chun Thai
Cameroon		Moscow, Russia	vacant
Canada	22.11.2023	Bucharest, Romania	Gavin Buchan
Chad	12.05.2022	Ankara, Turkey	Adoum Dangai Nokour Guet
Chile	17.03.2023	Bucharest, Romania	María Pía Busta Díaz
China		Sofia, Bulgaria	Wang Min (Chargé d'Affaires a.i.)
Colombia	25.07.2023	Warsaw, Poland	Assad José Jater Peña
Côte d'Ivoire		Rome, Italy	vacant
Croatia	19.09.2019	Sofia, Bulgaria	Jasna Ognjanovac
Cuba	07.04.2023	Sofia, Bulgaria	Marieta Garcia Jordan
Cyprus	01.12.2022	Sofia, Bulgaria	Haralambos Kafkarides
Czech Republic	15.02.2024	Sofia, Bulgaria	Miroslav Toman Jr.
Democratic Republic of Congo		Prague, Czech Republic	Christine Kayembe (Chargé d'Affaires a.i.)
Denmark	21.09.2021	Sofia, Bulgaria	Jes Brogaard Nielsen
Dominican Republic		Ankara, Turkey	vacant
Ecuador		Budapest, Hungary	Mariela Salguero (Chargé d'Affaires a.i.)
Egypt	15.02.2024	Sofia, Bulgaria	Nader Saad
El Salvador		Vienna, Austria	vacant
Eritrea		Moscow, Russia	vacant
Estonia	22.11.2023	Bucharest, Romania	Aune Kotli
Ethiopia	12.05.2022	Ankara, Turkey	Adem Mohammed Mahmud
Finland	19.01.2021	Sofia, Bulgaria	Kristiina Kuvaja-Xanthopoulos
France	01.12.2022	Sofia, Bulgaria	Joël Meyer
Georgia	07.04.2023	Sofia, Bulgaria	Otar Berdzenishvili
Germany	26.01.2023	Sofia, Bulgaria	Irene Maria Plank
Ghana	25.07.2023	Ankara, Turkey	Francisca Ashietey-Odunton
Greece	26.01.2023	Sofia, Bulgaria	Alexios Marios Lyberopoulos
Guatemala		Jerusalem, Israel	Elvira Eugenia Santizo de León (Chargé d'Affaires a.i.)
Guinea		Belgrade, Serbia	vacant
Guinea-Bissau		Moscow, Russia	vacant
Guyana		London, UK	vacant
Holy See	10.10.2022	Sofia, Bulgaria	Luciano Suriani
Hungary	13.10.2023	Sofia, Bulgaria	Miklós Boros
Iceland		Warsaw, Poland	vacant
India	28.07.2025	Sofia, Bulgaria	Amb Arun Sahu
Indonesia	07.01.2021	Sofia, Bulgaria	Iwan Bogananta
Iran	25.07.2023	Sofia, Bulgaria	Alireza Irvash
Iraq	19.01.2021	Sofia, Bulgaria	Lina Omar
Ireland	19.01.2021	Sofia, Bulgaria	Martina Feeney
Israel	13.10.2023	Sofia, Bulgaria	Yosef Levi-Sfari
Italy	19.01.2021	Sofia, Bulgaria	Giuseppina Zarra
Jamaica		Berlin, Germany	vacant Denise Ava-Lou Sealey (Chargé d'Affaires a.i.)
Japan	28.11.2025	Sofia, Bulgaria	Chikahisa Sumi
Jordan	28.09.2020	Bucharest, Romania	Sufyan Qudah
Kazakhstan	26.01.2023	Sofia, Bulgaria	Viktor Temirbayev
Kenya		Ankara, Turkey	vacant
Kosovo	13.10.2023	Sofia, Bulgaria	Haxhi Bajraktari
Kuwait	10.10.2022	Sofia, Bulgaria	Ghazi Hamed Alfadli
Kyrgyzstan		Kyiv, Ukraine	vacant
Laos		Berlin, Germany	vacant
Latvia	10.10.2022	Warsaw, Poland	Juris Poikāns
Lebanon	26.02.2018	Sofia, Bulgaria	Toufic Jaber
Lesotho		Rome, Italy	vacant
Libya	10.10.2022	Sofia, Bulgaria	Abu Baker A. Saeed Saleh
Lithuania	15.02.2024	Bucharest, Romania	Artūras Žurauskas
Luxembourg	13.11.2017	Luxembourg, Luxembourg	Ronald Dofing
Malawi		Berlin, Germany	vacant
Malaysia	12.05.2022	Bucharest, Romania	Tengku Dato' Sirajuzzaman bin Tengku Mohamed Ariffin
Mali	16.12.2019	Moscow, Russia	Aly Coulibaly
Malta	22.11.2023	Valletta, Malta	Anne Marie Muscat Fenech Adami
Mauritania		Berlin, Germany	vacant
Mexico	22.03.2022	Budapest, Hungary	Rosario Asela Molinero
Moldova	24.08.2020	Sofia, Bulgaria	Anatol Cebuc
Mongolia	17.12.2021	Sofia, Bulgaria	Sayanaa Lkhagvasuren
Montenegro		Sofia, Bulgaria	[[]] (Chargé d'Affaires a. i.)
Morocco	24.11.2016	Sofia, Bulgaria	Zakia El Midaoui
Myanmar		Belgrade, Serbia	Zarni Aung (Chargé d'Affaires a. i.)
Namibia		Vienna, Austria	Elise Pomwenepawa Shaduka (Chargé d'Affaires a. i.)
Nepal		Berlin, Germany	vacant
Netherlands	21.09.2021	Sofia, Bulgaria	Simon van der Burg
New Zealand	11.10.2021	Brussels, Belgium	Diana Reaich
Nicaragua		Rome, Italy	vacant
Niger	17.03.2023	Berlin, Germany	Souleymane Issakou
Nigeria		Bucharest, Romania	Desmond Chidi Okafor (Chargé d'Affaires a.i.)
North Korea	20.10.2015	Sofia, Bulgaria	Cha Kon Il
North Macedonia	10.10.2022	Sofia, Bulgaria	Agneza Rusi Popovska
Norway	16.03.2021	Bucharest, Romania	Siri Barry
Oman	28.09.2020	Vienna, Austria	Yousuf Ahmed Hamed Aljabri
Pakistan	31.01.2024	Sofia, Bulgaria	Modasar Chaudhry
Palestine		Sofia, Bulgaria	Adham Zainaldin (Chargé d'Affaires a.i.)
Panama	26.01.2023	Piraeus, Greece	Julie Lymberopulos Cosiori
Paraguay	25.07.2023	Vienna, Austria	Juan Francisco Facetti Fernandez
Peru		Athens, Greece	vacant
Philippines	26.01.2023	Budapest, Hungary	Frank R. Cimafranca
Poland	20.06.2019	Sofia, Bulgaria	Maciej Szymański
Portugal	19.01.2021	Sofia, Bulgaria	Ana Maria Ribeiro da Silva
Qatar	11.10.2021	Sofia, Bulgaria	Fahad Ibrahim Al-Mushairi
Romania	16.03.2021	Sofia, Bulgaria	Brândușa Ioana Predescu
Republic of Congo		Berlin, Germany	vacant
Russia	16.03.2021	Sofia, Bulgaria	Eleonora Mitrofanova
Rwanda	12.05.2022	Tel Aviv, Israel	James Gatera
San Marino	28.11.2018		Stefano Stolfi
Saudi Arabia	17.12.2021	Sofia, Bulgaria	Khalid Faqeeh
Serbia	08.10.2019	Sofia, Bulgaria	Željko Jović
Seychelles		Brussels, Belgium	vacant
Sierra Leone		Moscow, Russia	vacant
Singapore		Moscow, Russia	vacant
Slovakia	01.12.2022	Sofia, Bulgaria	Vasil Grivna
Slovenia	10.10.2022	Sofia, Bulgaria	Natasa Bergelj
Somalia		Moscow, Russia	vacant
South Africa		Sofia, Bulgaria	Renske Vos (Chargés d'Affaires a.i.)
South Korea	25.07.2023	Sofia, Bulgaria	Bae Jongin
Sovereign Military Order of Malta	20.06.2019	Sofia, Bulgaria	Ursula Höfter Zuccoli
Spain	20.06.2019	Sofia, Bulgaria	Alejandro Polanco
Sri Lanka	22.11.2023	Warsaw, Poland	Dhammika Kumari Semasinghe
Sudan		Sofia, Bulgaria	Aida Sid Ahmed Mohammed Ali Omer (Chargés d'Affaires a.i.)
Sweden	28.09.2020	Stockholm, Sweden	Katarina Rangnitt
Switzerland	21.09.2021	Sofia, Bulgaria	Raymund Furrer
Syria		Sofia, Bulgaria	Jamal Najib (Chargés d'Affaires a.i.)
Tanzania		Berlin, Germany	Angela Michael Ngaillo (Chargés d'Affaires a.i.)
Thailand		Bucharest, Romania	vacant
Togo		Berlin, Germany	vacant
Tunisia		Belgrade, Serbia	Foued Abdelkarim (Chargés d'Affaires a.i.)
Turkey	30.01.2020	Sofia, Bulgaria	Aylin Sekizkök
Turkmenistan		Moscow, Russia	vacant
Uganda	13.10.2023	Berlin, Germany	Stephen Mubiru
Ukraine	07.04.2023	Sofia, Bulgaria	Olesya Ilashchuk
United Arab Emirates		Sofia, Bulgaria	Hamad Alawadi (Chargés d'Affaires a.i.)
United Kingdom	08.10.2024	Sofia, Bulgaria	Nathaniel Copsey
United States	07.04.2023	Sofia, Bulgaria	Kenneth H. Merten
Uruguay		Bucharest, Romania	vacant
Uzbekistan	28.11.2018	Ankara, Turkey	Alisher Agzamkhodjaev
Vietnam	22.03.2022	Sofia, Bulgaria	Do Hoang Long
Yemen		Sofia, Bulgaria	Ahmed Shammer (Chargés d'Affaires e.p.)
Zambia		Paris, France	vacant
Zimbabwe	17.03.2023	Berlin, Germany	Alice Mashingaidze

== See also ==
- Foreign relations of Bulgaria
- List of diplomatic missions of Bulgaria
- List of diplomatic missions in Bulgaria
