= Ludlow Moody =

Ludlow Murcott Moody CBE (1 November 1892 – 19 November 1981) was a Jamaican doctor.

He was the son of Charles Ernest Moody, and, like his brother Harold Moody also studied medicine in London at King's College London Medical School, winning the Warneford scholarship, the Huxley Prize for physiology, the Warneford Prize and the Todd Prize for Clinical Medicine. Another brother was the sculptor Ronald Moody.

Returning to Jamaica, Ludlow Moody worked as government bacteriologist (1920–25), before setting up private practice in Kingston. During this period he was a justice of the peace, a member of Jamaica Public Services Commission and served as custos of Kingston from 1961 to 1963. He was awarded an honorary doctorate in laws from the University of the West Indies.

He was married twice: first to Vera Holme Manley (sister of Jamaican premier Norman Washington Manley), with whom he had one daughter, Pamela Margaret Moody, and later to Margaret Foster Smith. He was an Old Boy and former chairman of the Wolmer's Schools.

He was appointed a CBE in 1966 for Public Service.
