= Prindon Sadriu =

First Gentleman of Kosovo

First Gentleman of Kosovo
- In role 4 April 2021 – 4 April 2026
- President: Vjosa Osmani
- Preceded by: Himself (acting) (March 2021)
- Succeeded by: Alban Krasniqi (acting)
- Acting; 5 November 2020 – 22 March 2021
- President: Vjosa Osmani
- Preceded by: Lumnije Thaçi (As First Lady of Kosovo)
- Succeeded by: Himself (April 2021)

Personal details
- Born: 28 February 1980 (age 46) Gjilan, SFRY now Kosovo
- Spouse: Vjosa Osmani (m. 2012)
- Education: Flinders University; RIT Kosovo
- Profession: Diplomat

Military service
- Rank: Minister Plenipotentiary

Prindon Sadriu (born 28 February 1980) is a Kosovar diplomat and military reservist who has served as the First Gentleman of Kosovo since 4 April 2021, following the inauguration of his wife, President Vjosa Osmani. He is a career diplomat within the Ministry of Foreign Affairs and Diaspora of Kosovo and holds the diplomatic rank of Minister Plenipotentiary.

== Early life and education ==
Sadriu was born on 28 February 1980 in Gjilan, Kosovo. He completed his undergraduate studies in International Relations at Flinders University in Adelaide, Australia. He later obtained a postgraduate degree in international relations from the same institution.

After returning to Kosovo, Sadriu completed postgraduate studies in Public Policy at RIT Kosovo (Rochester Institute of Technology Kosovo). He has also pursued doctoral studies in international diplomacy. In 2009, he completed an executive education program in public policy at the Harvard Kennedy School. He has additionally undertaken public policy and diplomatic studies at the École nationale d'administration (ENA) and the Diplomatic Academy of Vienna.

== Diplomatic career ==
Sadriu is part of the first generation of career diplomats of the Ministry of Foreign Affairs and Diaspora of Kosovo. He initially served as Head of the Directorate for Bilateral Relations and later held responsibilities related to international organizations, security affairs, and continental Europe.

He served as Chargé d'Affaires at the Embassy of Kosovo in Panama City and at the Embassy of Kosovo in Skopje, North Macedonia. He has also served as Deputy Chief of Mission at the Embassy of Kosovo in Skopje. He has held the diplomatic rank of Minister Plenipotentiary.

Sadriu has served as National Coordinator for the Brdo-Brijuni Process and for the V4+ Initiative involving the Visegrád Group countries.

Prior to joining the diplomatic service in 2008, Sadriu worked as Foreign Relations Advisor to the Speaker of the Parliament of Albania. He also completed professional engagements in the United States Congress.

== Military service ==
Since 2011, Sadriu has been a member of the reserve component of the Kosovo Security Force. He holds the rank of Lieutenant Colonel (OF-4) and has served as an advisor to the Commander of the Land Forces. His military experience includes service within the Kosovo Security Force and training with the Royal Australian Armoured Corps.

== Academic and public engagement ==
Sadriu has lectured in International Relations and Comparative Studies at RIT Kosovo and at the South East European University in North Macedonia. He has delivered lectures and presentations at institutions including the George C. Marshall European Center for Security Studies in Germany and the Aspen Institute Romania.

In addition to his diplomatic and academic activities, Sadriu has been involved in initiatives related to cultural promotion and advocacy projects in Kosovo. He has also served in leadership roles within Kosovo reserve officers' associations.

== Personal life ==
Sadriu has been married to President Vjosa Osmani since 2014. They have two daughters.
