= Secretary General of the Anglican Communion =

Administrative head of the Anglican Communion

- Incumbent; Rt. Rev. Anthony Poggo since 1 September 2022
- Formation: 1968
- First holder: Ralph Dean
- Deputy: Rt. Rev. Jo Bailey Wells
- Website: Anglican Communion Office

The Secretary General of the Anglican Communion is the chief administrative officer of the Anglican Communion, which encompasses over 85 million Anglicans in more than 165 countries.

== Role and Responsibilities ==
The Secretary General heads the Anglican Communion's secretariat, based at St Andrew’s House in London, UK. The role involves overseeing the administrative aspects of the Communion's operations, including:

- Managing the preparation and execution of meetings of the Anglican Consultative Council, the Primates' Meeting, and the Lambeth Conference.
- Supporting the Communion's engagement with the United Nations and other ecumenical and international bodies.
- Facilitating communication and collaboration among the various member churches of the Anglican Communion.

== History ==
The position of Secretary General was established following the creation of the Anglican Consultative Council at the Lambeth Conference in 1968. Before this, the role was known as the "Executive Officer of the Anglican Communion." The first Secretary General was Ralph Dean, who served from 1969 to 1971.

== List of Secretaries General ==
Secretary General	Term of Office
Ralph Dean	1969–1971
John Howe	1971–1982
Sam Van Culin	1982–1994
John Peterson	1994–2004
Kenneth Kearon	2005–2015
Josiah Idowu-Fearon	2015–2022
Anthony Poggo	2022–present

== Selection ==
The Secretary General is appointed by the Standing Committee of the Anglican Consultative Council, which acts on behalf of the entire Communion's leadership.

== See also ==
- Anglican Communion
- Lambeth Conference
- Anglican Consultative Council
