= Anthony Poggo =

South Sudanese Anglican bishop

The Right Reverend Anthony Poggo
- Secretary General of the Anglican Communion
- Province: Province of Canterbury
- In office: 2022 to present
- Predecessor: Josiah Idowu-Fearon
- Other post: Bishop of Kajo-Keji

Orders
- Ordination: 1995 (deacon); 1996 (priest)
- Consecration: 2007

Personal details
- Born: 1964 (age 61–62) South Sudan
- Denomination: Anglicanism
- Spouse: Jane
- Children: Three
- Education: University of Juba; Oxford Brookes University

Anthony Poggo (born 1964) is a South Sudanese Anglican bishop. Since 2022, he has been the secretary general of the Anglican Consultative Council and head of the Anglican Communion Office.

== Early life and education ==
During his childhood, Poggo's father, an Anglican priest, took his children to Uganda to flee the first Sudanese Civil War. They returned in 1973. Poggo was educated at the University of Juba and Oxford Brookes University.

== Career ==
Poggo worked for the Scripture Union. He was ordained a deacon in 1995 and a priest in 1996. He then joined Across, a Christian mission agency working in Sudan, eventually becoming its executive director. In 2007 he was elected bishop of the South Sudanese diocese of Kajo-Keji, a position he held until 2016 when he moved to Lambeth Palace to support Archbishop of Canterbury Justin Welby as his adviser on Anglican Communion affairs. In 2022, he succeeded Josiah Idowu-Fearon as secretary-general of the Anglican Communion.

Anglican Communion titles
| Preceded by Manasseh Dawidi | Bishop of Kajo-Keji; 2007–2016 | Succeeded by Emmanuel Murye Modi |
| Preceded by Josiah Idowu-Fearon | Secretary-General of the Anglican Communion; Since 2022 | Incumbent |
