= Cheryl Spencer =

Jamaican diplomat

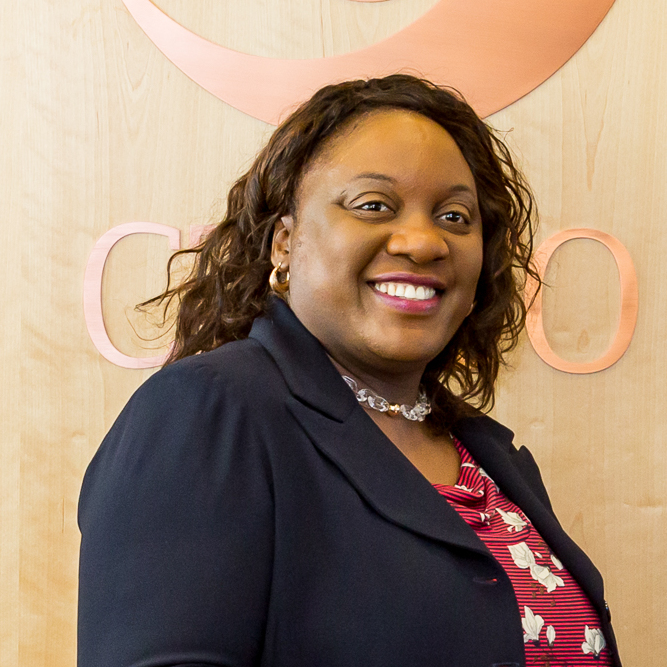
HE Cheryl Spencer in Vienna

Cheryl Kay Spencer is the Jamaican Permanent Representative to the United Nations (UN) and its Specialized Agencies in Geneva, Switzerland after having served as High Commissioner to South Africa. She presented her credentials on February 12, 2019.

Spencer earned a bachelor's degree in International Relations from the University of the West Indies.
