= Han Tae-song =

North Korean diplomat

Han Tae-song (Korean: 한대성) is a diplomat from the Democratic People's Republic of Korea (North Korea) who most recently served as its ambassador to the United Nations in Geneva.

As a career diplomat, he has served as North Korea's top envoy to Italy, Malta, Greece and Spain. In 1992, while serving in Zimbabwe, he was expelled from the country after being caught engaging in the illicit trafficking of rhino horns.

In 2017 he was appointed ambassador to Switzerland. In September of the same year, he made a direct threat on behalf of his country to the United States of America.

He was recalled in December 2023 amid North Korean and Swiss investigations into his alleged involvement in ivory trafficking.
