= Anglican Consultative Council =

International body of the Anglican Communion

The Anglican Consultative Council (ACC) is one of the four "Instruments of Communion" of the Anglican Communion. It was created by a resolution of the 1968 Lambeth Conference. The council, which includes Anglican bishops, other clergy, and laity, meets every two or three years in different parts of the world.

The Anglican Consultative Council has a permanent secretariat (the Anglican Communion Office), based at Saint Andrew's House, London, which is responsible for organizing meetings of the "Instruments of Communion". The archbishop of Canterbury is ex officio the president of the council. The current chair of the ACC is Maggie Swinson, succeeding Paul Kwong from February 2023 onwards.

== Membership ==
Members of the council include the archbishop of Canterbury and a certain number of representatives of each of the Anglican provinces, depending on the size of the province.

The largest provinces are entitled to appoint three representatives, consisting of one bishop, one priest, and one layperson. Intermediate sized provinces may appoint two persons: one layperson and one ordained (either bishop or priest). The smallest provinces appoint only one person, preferably from among the laity. Additionally, the council may co-opt up to six additional members of whom two shall be women and two persons not over 28 years of age at the time of appointment.

If the chairperson or the vice-chair of the council should be elected to this position for a term which exceeds the term of their appointment to the council, their council membership is extended until the expiration of the term as chair, while the province to which he or she belongs is entitled to make an additional appointment.

For the purposes of apportioning the membership on the Anglican Consultative Council, the large provinces are considered to be:

- Anglican Church of Australia
- Anglican Church of Canada
- Church of England
- Church of Nigeria (Anglican Communion)
- Church of the Province of Rwanda
- Church of the Province of Southern Africa
- Church of South India
- Anglican Church of Tanzania
- Church of the Province of Uganda
- The Episcopal Church (TEC)

Intermediate-sized provinces are:

- Anglican Church of Aotearoa, New Zealand, and Polynesia
- Church of the Province of Central Africa
- Province of the Anglican Church of the Congo
- Church of Ireland
- Anglican Church of Kenya
- Church of North India
- Church of Pakistan
- Episcopal Church of the Sudan
- Church in Wales
- Church in the Province of the West Indies

The smallest provinces include:

- Church of Bangladesh
- Anglican Episcopal Church of Brazil
- Church of the Province of Burundi
- Anglican Church in Central America
- Church of Ceylon
- Hong Kong Sheng Kung Hui
- Church of the Province of the Indian Ocean
- Nippon Sei Ko Kai (Anglican Church in Japan)
- Episcopal Church in Jerusalem and the Middle East
- Anglican Church of Korea
- Church of the Province of Melanesia
- Anglican Church of Mexico
- Church of the Province of Myanmar
- Anglican Church of Papua New Guinea
- Episcopal Church in the Philippines
- Anglican Church of South America
- Scottish Episcopal Church
- Church of the Province of Southeast Asia
- Church of the Province of West Africa

== Functions ==
According to the 1968 resolution, the council has eight functions:

1. To share information about developments in one or more provinces with the other parts of the Communion and to serve as needed as an instrument of common action.
2. To advise on inter-Anglican, provincial, and diocesan relationships, including the division of provinces, the formation of new provinces and of regional councils, and the problems of extraprovincial dioceses.
3. To develop as far as possible agreed Anglican policies in the world mission of the Church and to encourage national and regional Churches to engage together in developing and implementing such policies by sharing their resources of manpower, money, and experience to the best advantage of all.
4. To keep before national and regional Churches the importance of the fullest possible Anglican collaboration with other Christian Churches.
5. To encourage and guide Anglican participation in the ecumenical movement and the ecumenical organisations; to co-operate with the World Council of Churches and the world confessional bodies on behalf of the Anglican Communion; and to make arrangements for the conduct of pan-Anglican conversations with the Roman Catholic Church, the Eastern Orthodox Churches, and other Churches.
6. To advise on matters arising out of national or regional Church union negotiations or conversations and on subsequent relations with united Churches.
7. To advise on problems on inter-Anglican communication and to help in the dissemination of Anglican and ecumenical information.
8. To keep in review the needs that may arise for further study and, where necessary, to promote inquiry and research.

== Important meetings ==
=== 2005 ===
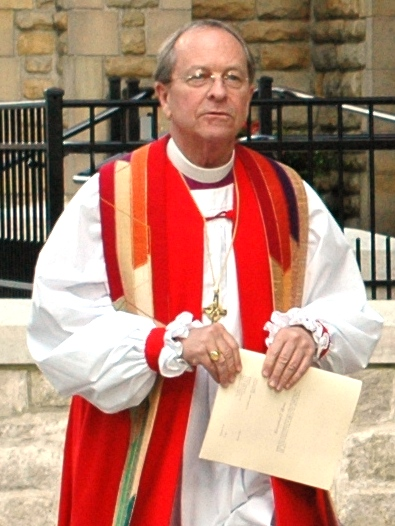
The consecration of Bishop Gene Robinson was a source of controversy at the 2005 meeting.

The 13th meeting of the ACC was concerned with the controversy surrounding the policies about homosexuality, particularly the consecration of openly homosexual bishops. A resolution to expel the American and Canadian provinces from all church bodies was rejected. An alternative resolution was passed by a vote of 30 to 28. It stated support in the Anglican Communion to reaffirmed "the standard of Christian teaching on matters of human sexuality expressed in the 1998 Lambeth Resolution 1.10, It also repeated the position stated at the 2005 Primates' Meeting, that the Episcopal Church (USA) and the Anglican Church of Canada needed to "voluntarily withdraw their members" from the ACC—including its "Standing Committee and the Inter-Anglican Finance and Administration Committee" until the next Lambeth Conference in 2008.

=== 2016 ===
The 2016 meeting of the ACC made its Resolutions against a background of contentious debates and divided votes regarding homosexuality in the 1998 Lambeth Conference and the boycott by 230 bishops including six Prelates of the 2008 Lambeth Conference over the same issue. It seemed after these two conferences that the homosexuality issue might break up the Anglican Communion. Against this background, continued unity of the Lambeth Communion was endorsed by an ACC Resolution that affirmed "the commitment of the Primates of the Anglican Communion to walk together; and commits to continue to seek appropriate ways for the provinces of the Anglican Communion to walk together with each other and with the Primates and other Instruments of Communion".

== List of Anglican Consultative Council meetings ==
- Limuru, Kenya (1971)
- Dublin, Ireland (1973)
- Trinidad and Tobago (1976)
- London, Ontario, Canada (1979)
- Newcastle-upon-Tyne, England (1981)
- Badagry, Nigeria (1984)
- Singapore (1987)
- Wales (1990)
- Cape Town, South Africa (1993)
- Panama (1996)
- Dundee, Scotland (1999)
- Hong Kong (2002)
- Nottingham, England (2005)
- Kingston, Jamaica (2009)
- Auckland, New Zealand (2012)
- Lusaka, Zambia (2016)
- Hong Kong (2019)
- Accra, Ghana (2023)
- Belfast, Northern Ireland (2026)

== Secretary general ==
The council employs a secretary general as a sort of ambassador, of and between the Anglican churches; they are based at the Anglican Communion Office in London and sometimes (erroneously) referred to as Secretary General of the Anglican Communion. Prior to the creation of the ACC, there was a similar post called "Executive Officer of the Anglican Communion"; the last "Anglican Executive Officer" became the first secretary-general and the Anglican Communion Office numbers Idowu-Fearon as the seventh secretary-general.

=== Executive officers ===
- 1 January 1960 – 1964: Stephen F. Bayne Jr., former Bishop of Olympia, was also responsible for the American Episcopal churches of Europe
- 1 November 1964 – 1969: Ralph Dean, Bishop of Cariboo, Canada, took leave from his diocese (but retained the See) in order to serve as executive officer, based in his native London
- 1 May 1969 – 1971: John Howe, former Bishop of St Andrews, Dunkeld and Dunblane, Scotland

=== Secretaries general ===
- 1 March 1971 – 31 December 1982 (res.): John Howe, previously Anglican executive officer
- 1 January 1983 – 31 December 1994 (ret.): Sam Van Culin, former executive for World Mission, The Episcopal Church. Samuel Van Culin (born 1930, Honolulu) was ordained on 30 November 1955 at St Andrew's Cathedral, Honolulu.
- 1 January 1995 – 31 December 2004: John L. Peterson, former dean of St. George's College, Jerusalem. John Louis Peterson (born 17 December 1942, Wadena, Minnesota) was ordained in 1976 by Charles E. Bennison Sr., Bishop of Western Michigan.
- 18 January 2005 – "late" 2014: Kenneth Kearon (became Bishop of Limerick and Killaloe, Ireland)
- 4 September 2015 – August 2022: Josiah Idowu-Fearon, former archbishop of Kaduna, Nigeria
- Since August 2022: Anthony Poggo, former bishop of Kajo-Keji, South Sudan
