= Maria Alessandra Albertini =

Sammarinese diplomat (born 1961)

Ambassador to the Holy See
- Incumbent
- Assumed office 14 April 2016
- Preceded by: Clelio Galassi

Personal details
- Born: 15 March 1961 (age 65)
- Children: 2
- Education: University of Urbino

Maria Alessandra Albertini (born 15 March 1961) is a Sammarinese diplomat. She has been serving as the ambassador to the Holy See since 2016.

== Career ==
Albertini was born on 15 March 1961. She got a degree in law from the University of Urbino and completed postgraduate training for a diplomatic career at the Foundation for International Research and Studies in Florence, Italy.

She joined San Marino's Department of Foreign Affairs in 1989 and entered the diplomatic career in 1993, holding various diplomatic and administrative positions, including non-resident ambassador to Malta and Cyprus since 2000. She also chaired San Marino's National Committee for UNICEF from 1997 to 2014. In 2014, Albertini became Director of Legal Affairs at the Department of Foreign Affairs, with the rank of Minister Plenipotentiary.

On 15 March 2016, the Sammarinese government appointed Albertini as the new ambassador to the Holy See as a proposal of the Secretary of State for Foreign and Political Affairs to succeed Clelio Galassi. She presented her credentials to the Pope Francis on 14 April 2016.

Albertini attended the funeral of Pope Francis alongside Captains Regent Denise Bronzetti and Italo Righi on 26 April 2025 and the inauguration of Pope Leo XIV on 18 May 2025.

== Personal life ==
She is married and have two children. Albertini is member of the Order of the Holy Sepulchre.
