= Bergoglio =

Bergoglio (pronounced [berˈɡɔʎʎo]) is an Italian surname from Piedmont, referring to an ancient site located where the modern Cittadella of Alessandria stands. Notable people with the name include:

- Carlo "Carlin" Bergoglio (1895–1959), Italian sportswriter for Guerin Sportivo
- Jorge Mario Bergoglio (1936–2025), Argentine prelate, head of the Roman Catholic Church from 2013 to 2025 as Pope Francis
- Cristina Bergoglio (born 1967), Argentine painter, writer and architect, niece of Pope Francis

== See also ==
- Felice Borgoglio (born 1941), Italian politician
- McGogio, alter ego of the Tiny Toon Adventures character Gogo Dodo
- Bertoglio
