= Ordo Exsequiarum Romani Pontificis =

Catholic papal funerary book

The Ordo Exsequiarum Romani Pontificis (Rite of Burial of the Roman Pontiff) is a liturgical book which contains the rites preceding and during the Catholic funerary liturgy for a Bishop of Rome, the pope of the Catholic Church. The book has been published in two editions, with the first authorized in 1998 and published in 2000 and the second authorized and published in 2024. It is published by the Dicastery for Divine Worship and the Discipline of the Sacraments's Office for the Liturgical Celebrations of the Supreme Pontiff. This text, alongside the Ordo Rituum Conclavis, prescribes the nine consecutive days (novemdiales) of mourning following a pope's death.

Three stations are described in the Ordo Exsequiarum Romani Pontificis, with events taking place at the papal chapel, St. Peter's Basilica, and the place of burial. The rites prescribed include the ascertainment of death, the procession of the body to the basilica, the funeral, and the burial.

== Contents ==
The Ordo Exsequiarum Romani Pontificis (Rite of Burial for Roman Pontiffs) is a thin red liturgical book containing the rites preceding and during the funerary liturgy for a Bishop of Rome, the pope of the Catholic Church. A first edition was approved in 1998, followed by a second edition with revisions in 2024. It is published by the Office for the Liturgical Celebrations of the Supreme Pontiff, part of the Dicastery for Divine Worship and the Discipline of the Sacraments.

The Ordo Exsequiarum Romani Pontificis governs the events surrounding the funerary rites alongside the Ordo Rituum Conclavis, including the nine consecutive days of mourning (novemdiales) following a pope's death. The liturgical and ceremonial texts also described actions for circumstances where a pope's death is anticipated. The book describes three stations (also called moments) following a pope's death, taking place at three locations: the papal chapel, St. Peter's Basilica, and the pope's place of burial.

=== First station ===
Once he has learned that the pope has died, the Camerlengo of the Holy Roman Church – the cardinal responsible for the operations of the Vatican between papacies – is required to immediately make an official declaration that the pope has died. The official in charge of the Vatican's health service determines the cause of death and produces a report. The dead pope is then dressed in white.

The camerlengo will preside over the rite of ascertainment of death, which takes place in the presence of the Master of Pontifical Liturgical Celebrations and the Apostolic Camera's clergy, chancellor, and secretary. After this, his body is immediately placed within his coffin. The camerlengo is then to produce a declaration that the pope has died and include the health service's report.

The pope's body, still in the chapel, is dressed in red liturgical vestments, including his mitre and pallium. A paschal candle is placed adjacent to the coffin. The Master of Pontifical Liturgical Celebrations is authorized to determine whether additional people are permitted to pay their respects before the body is taken to St. Peter's Basilica.

=== Second station ===
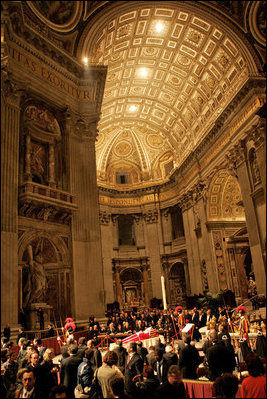
Mourners view John Paul II's body at St. Peter's Basilica. A paschal candle is visible next to the coffin.

The coffin and body are translated to St. Peter's Basilica in a procession led by the camerlengo, an action detailed in provisions 41 through 65 of the Ordo Exsequiarum Romani Pontificis. The Litany of the Saints is sung during the procession. There, the body and coffin are set facing the pews and the paschal candle is placed next to the coffin. During this exposition, public is permitted to venerate the pope's body within the open coffin.

Prior to the coffin being sealed, Vatican coins minted during the papacy are put into a bag and placed within the coffin. A one-page account of the papacy (Italian: rogito) is written. It is read by the Master of Pontifical Liturgical Celebrations, inserted into a tube, and placed in the coffin; a copy is retained for the Vatican Archives.

Once the coffin is sealed, a funeral is held. While the funeral is intended to be presided over by the dean of the College of Cardinals, the vice-dean or any senior cardinal can fulfill this role if the dean cannot do so.

=== Third station ===
Most popes are buried at St. Peter's Basilica, but the Ordo Exsequiarum Romani Pontificis permits burials elsewhere. The text calls for the camerlengo to preside over the burial. A variety of seals are placed on the coffin prior to its final entombment.

== History ==
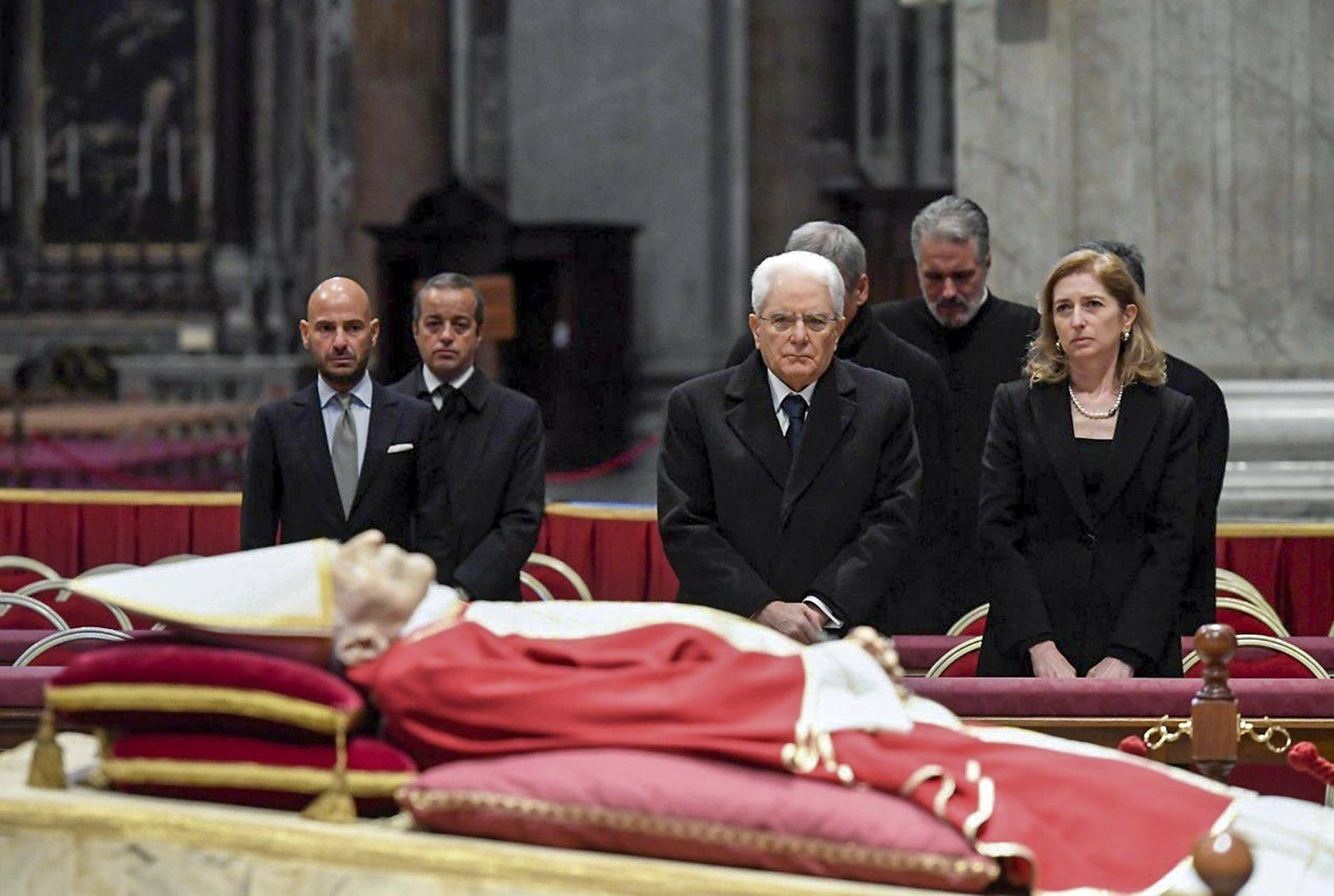
Pope Benedict XVI's 2023 funeral was the second funeral celebrated according to the Ordo Exsequiarum Romani Pontificis and the last to use the first edition.

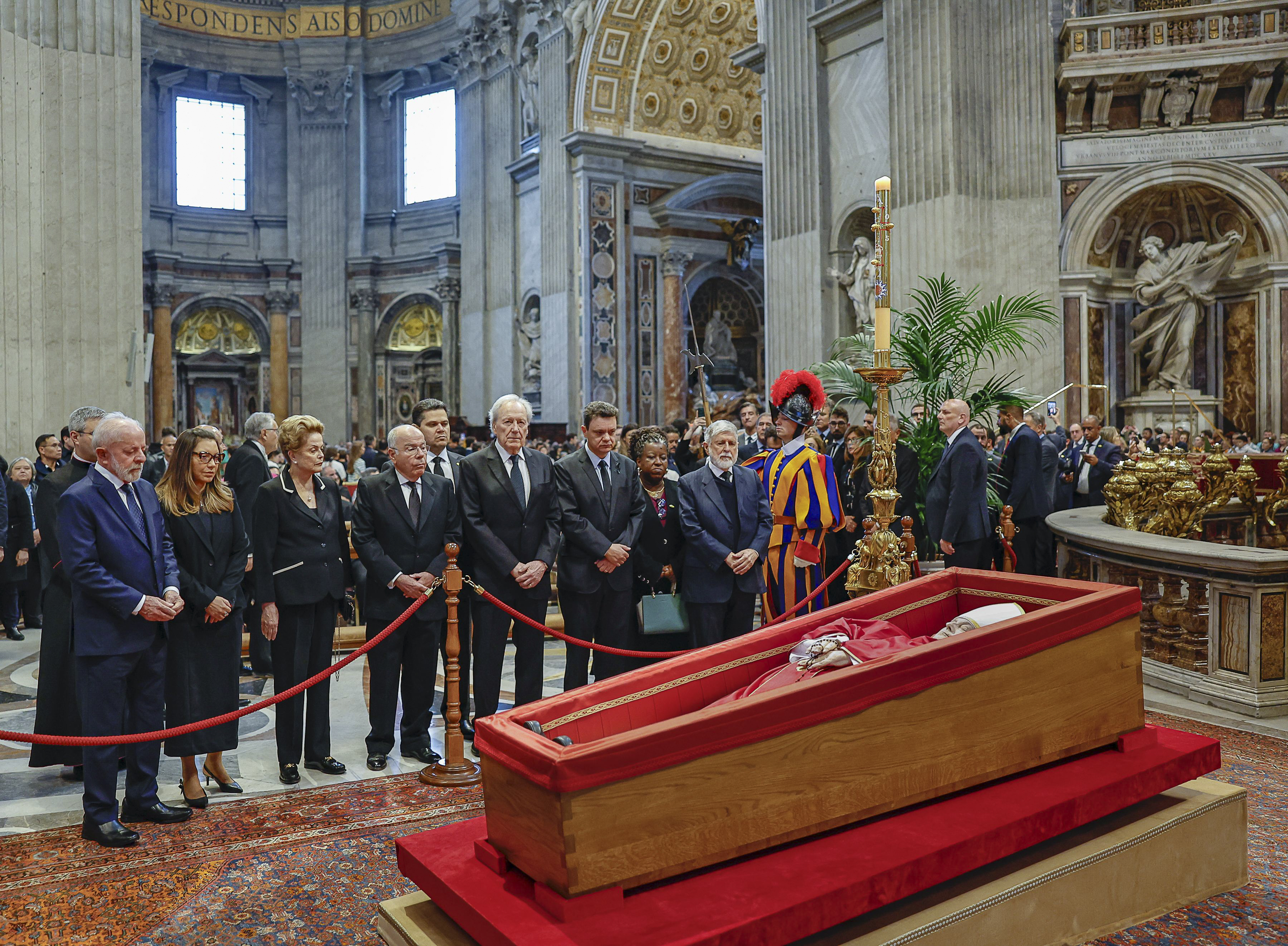
The funeral of Pope Francis in 2025 used the second edition of Ordo Exsequiarum Romani Pontificis.

The first editio typica of the Ordo Exsequiarum Romani Pontificis was approved by Pope John Paul II in 1998 and published in 2000. This version of the text was used at two papal funerals: the 2005 funeral of John Paul II and the 2023 funeral of Benedict XVI.

In April 2024, Pope Francis approved the editio typica of the second edition. Archbishop Diego Ravelli, the Master of Pontifical Liturgical Celebrations, said the edition was produced at Francis's request. Ravelli said that the pope had sought to "simplify and adapt certain rites so that the celebration of the funeral of the Bishop of Rome may better express the faith of the Church in the Risen Christ". The first copies of the second edition were circulated in November 2024. Ravelli described the second edition as a "renewed rite" which intended to emphasize the papal funeral as "that of a pastor and disciple of Christ and not of a powerful person of this world".

Among the changes in the second edition was the location of the ascertainment of death. Previously, the ascertainment of death would take place in the room where the pope died. Simplifications made in the second edition included altered rubrics for the papal coffins: instead of the traditional three coffins made from cypress, lead, and oak, a wooden coffin containing a lining or second coffin made of zinc is authorized and it can remain open for public veneration. Other changes included the use of the simplest papal titles within the ceremonies and elimination of a station that took place at the Apostolic Palace. The Apostolic Palace station formerly saw the pope's body displayed outside of the coffin.

In the first edition, the pope's vested body was placed on an elevated bier in St. Peter's Basilica for the lying in state before being placed in the coffin. The second edition removed the bier, oriented the coffin towards the pews, and called for a paschal candle to be placed adjacent to the coffin. The second edition also permitted papal burials to take place in a place other than St. Peter's Basilica.

Pope Francis's funeral in April 2025 used the second edition.
