= Brush-by diplomacy =

Brief informal encounters between politicians

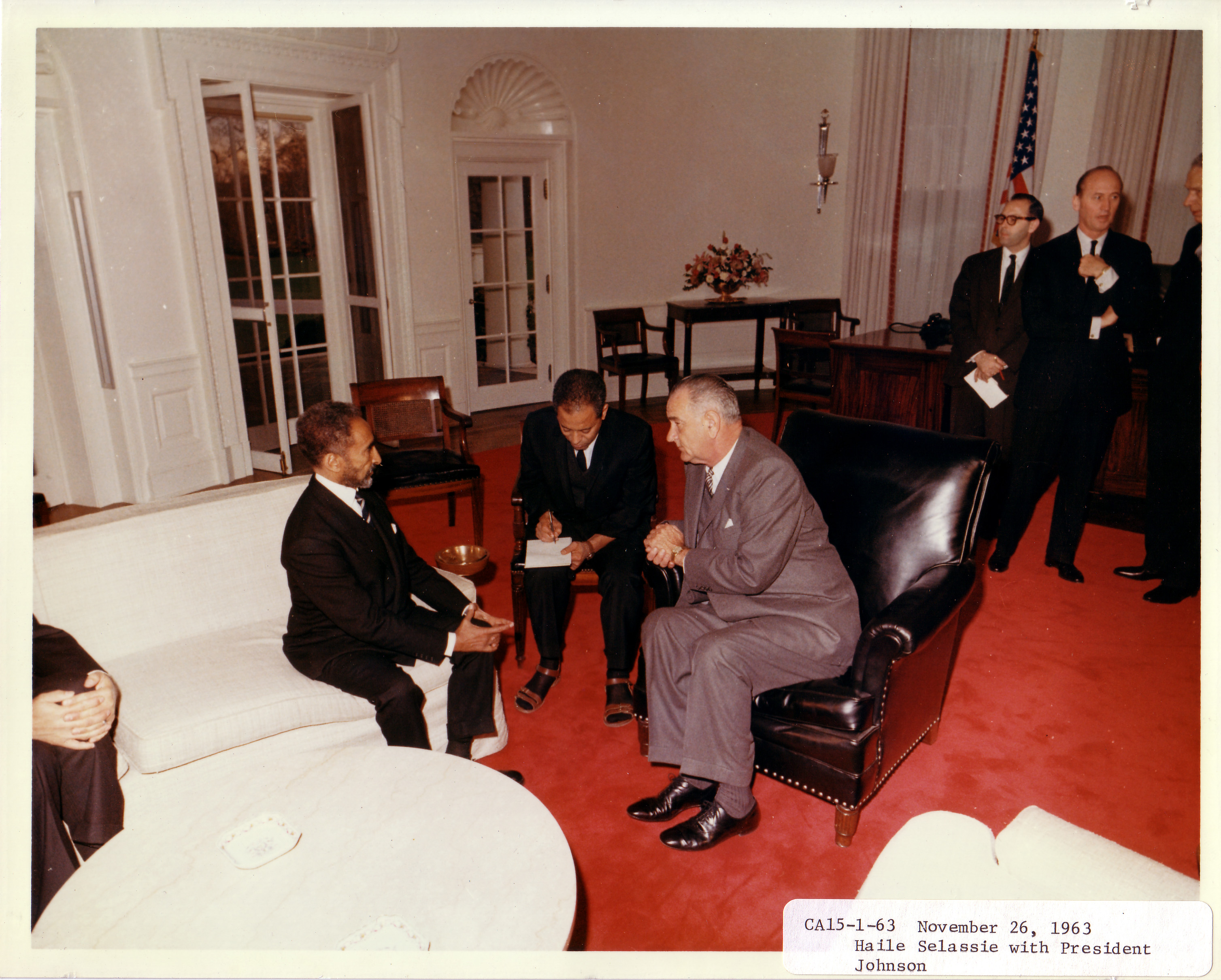
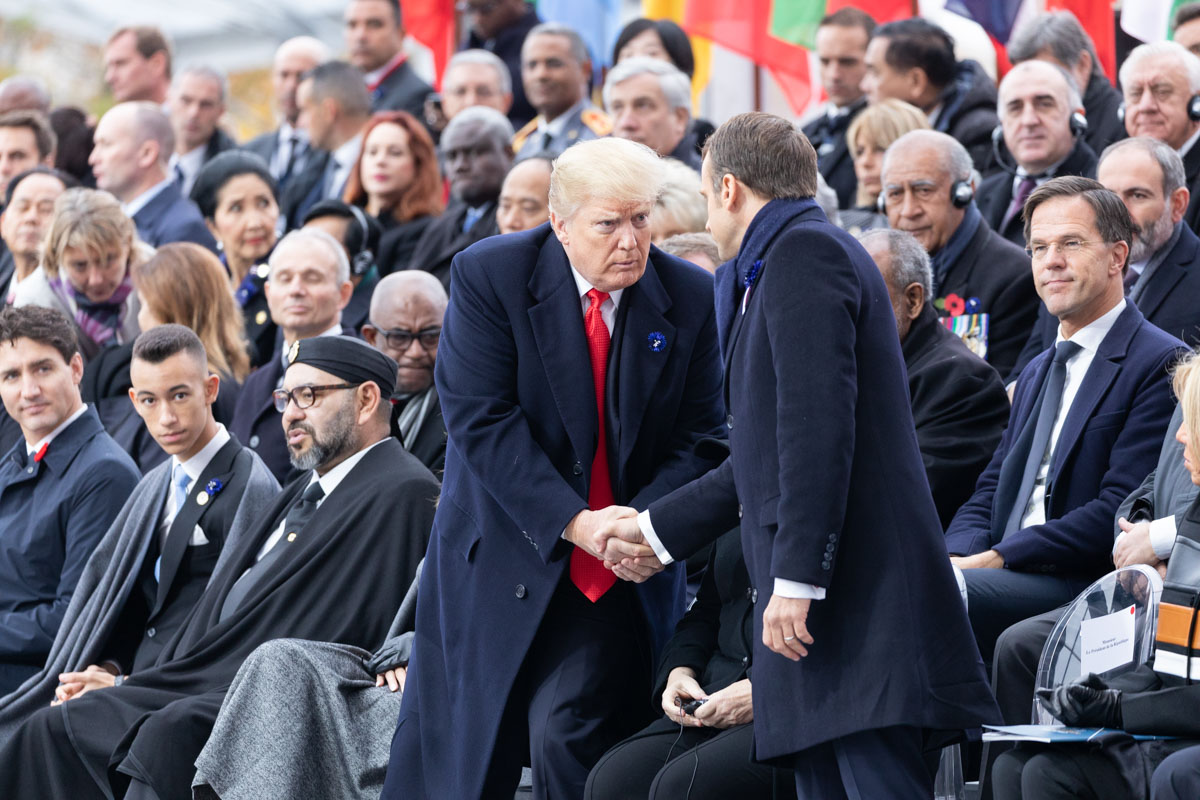
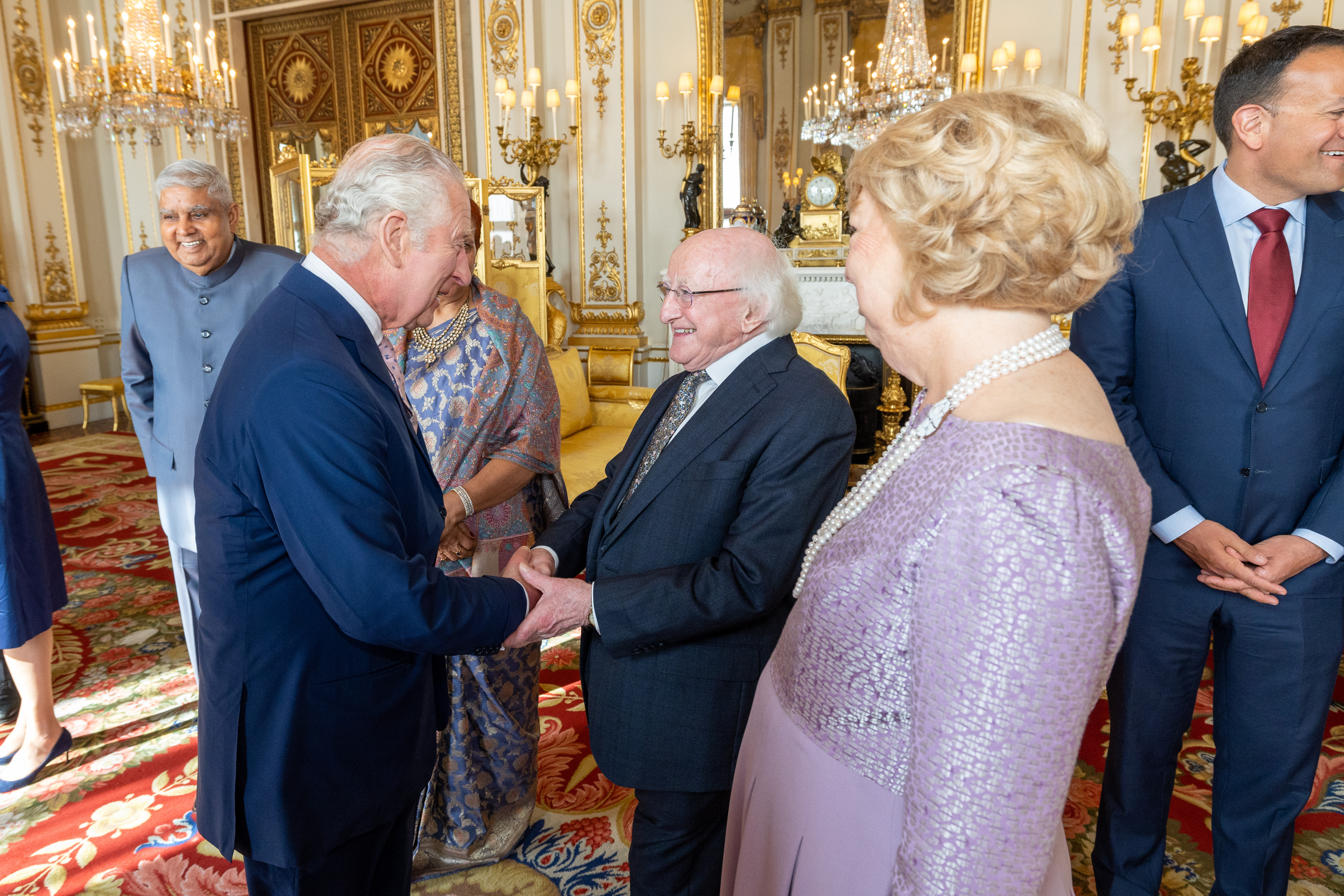
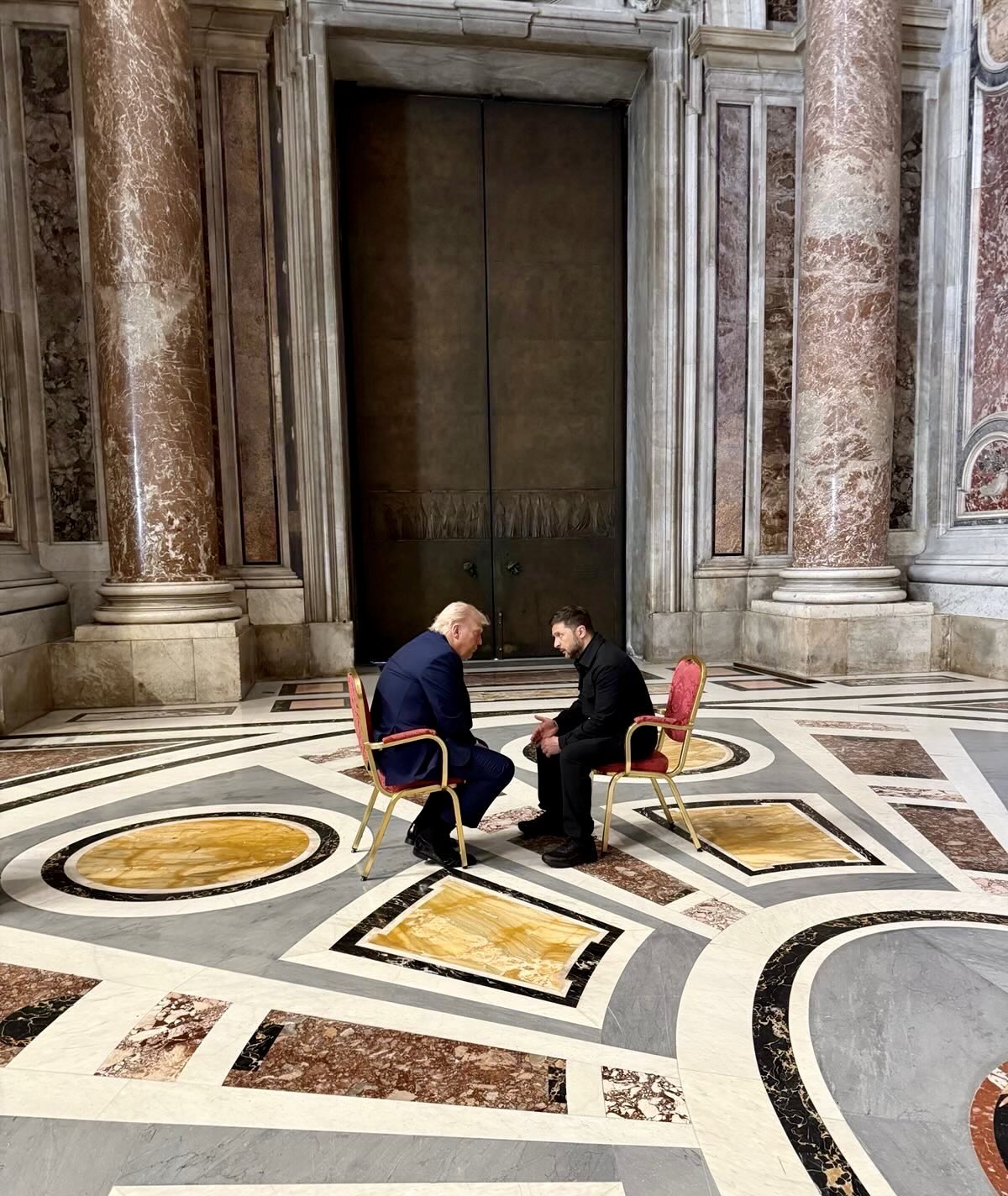
Examples of brush-by diplomacy (top to bottom, left to right):
- U.S. President Lyndon B. Johnson with Ethiopian Emperor Haile Selassie during a reception following the state funeral of John F. Kennedy, 26 November 1963
- U.S. President Donald Trump and French President Emmanuel Macron shaking hands during a ceremony marking the centenary of the World War I armistice, 11 November 2018
- Charles III of the United Kingdom shaking hands with Irish President Michael D. Higgins at Buckingham Palace ahead of the former's coronation, 5 May 2023
- Trump and Ukrainian President Volodymyr Zelenskyy at St. Peter's Basilica ahead of the funeral of Pope Francis, April 2025

Brush-by diplomacy occurs when politicians have brief informal encounters outside of normal diplomatic channels.

The BBC correspondent James Landale described "serendipitous conversations that can take place on the margins of a summit or a ceremony" as leaders "brush by" one another. The term refers to leaders "brushing by" each other at a diplomatic event. A brush-by is a shorter and more casual encounter between leaders at an event than a "pull aside". The brush-by is part of a range of informal encounters at summits alongside the pull-aside, walk-and-talk or a "quick tête-à-tête in a side room". Such encounters were stymied by the COVID-19 pandemic which saw the rise of digital diplomacy and the decline of the "face-to-face" encounter.

== Examples ==
Brush-by diplomacy often occurs at state funerals. The term "working funeral" is attributed to British prime minister Harold Wilson, who used it in reference to the state funeral of former prime minister Winston Churchill in 1965, which saw a record number of foreign leaders attending at the time. In September 2022, prime minister Liz Truss held bilateral meetings with several world leaders who travelled to the UK for the funeral of Queen Elizabeth II.

In Japan, the term "funeral diplomacy" (弔問外交, chōmon gaikō) is used to describe informal encounters between leaders attending funerals. Noboru Takeshita and Toshiki Kaifu, both serving as prime minister at the time of the state funeral of Japanese emperor Hirohito and the enthronement of Akihito respectively, met with several world leaders who attended the events in Japan. The funeral of Hirohito also provided an opportunity for officials from China and Indonesia to briefly discuss normalization of diplomatic relations.

The sign of peace at papal funerals has been seen as particularly fraught for "brush-by" moments as leaders may unexpectedly encounter leaders they would ordinarily avoid. At the funeral of Pope John Paul II in April 2005, Charles, Prince of Wales unexpectedly shook hands with the president of Zimbabwe, Robert Mugabe, who had been barred from travel to the European Union. The funeral of Pope Francis in April 2025, the largest gathering of world leaders since the funeral of Elizabeth II, offered an opportunity for brush-by diplomacy; U.S. President Donald Trump and Ukrainian President Volodymyr Zelenskyy met at St. Peter's Basilica ahead of the funeral and discussed a possible ceasefire for the Russo-Ukrainian war. The two last met at a meeting in the White House two months prior.

Before the 2012 Summer Olympics opening ceremony, some leaders were allowed a "brush-by" encounter with British prime minister David Cameron, who had already formally met leaders of more strategic countries at 10 Downing Street.
