= Litany of the Saints =

Formal prayer of the Catholic Church

The Litany of the Saints (Latin: Litaniae Sanctorum) is a formal prayer of the Roman Catholic Church as well as the Old Catholic Church, Lutheran congregations of Evangelical Catholic churchmanship, Anglican congregations of Anglo-Catholic churchmanship, and Western Rite Orthodox communities. It is a prayer to the Triune God, which also includes invocations for the intercession of the Blessed Virgin Mary, the Angels and all the martyrs and saints upon whom Christianity was founded, and those recognised as saints through the subsequent history of the church. Following the invocation of the saints, the Litany concludes with a series of supplications to God to hear the prayers of the worshippers. It is most prominently sung during the Easter Vigil, All Saints' Day, and in the liturgy for conferring Holy Orders, the Consecration of a Virgin and reception of the perpetual vows of a religious or a diocesane hermit. Its extensive use for special liturgies, high degree of adaptability, typical inclusion of many popular saints, and wide-ranging invocations have made it one of the Church’s most popular prayers and an emblematic expression of Catholic spirituality.

== Catholic practice ==
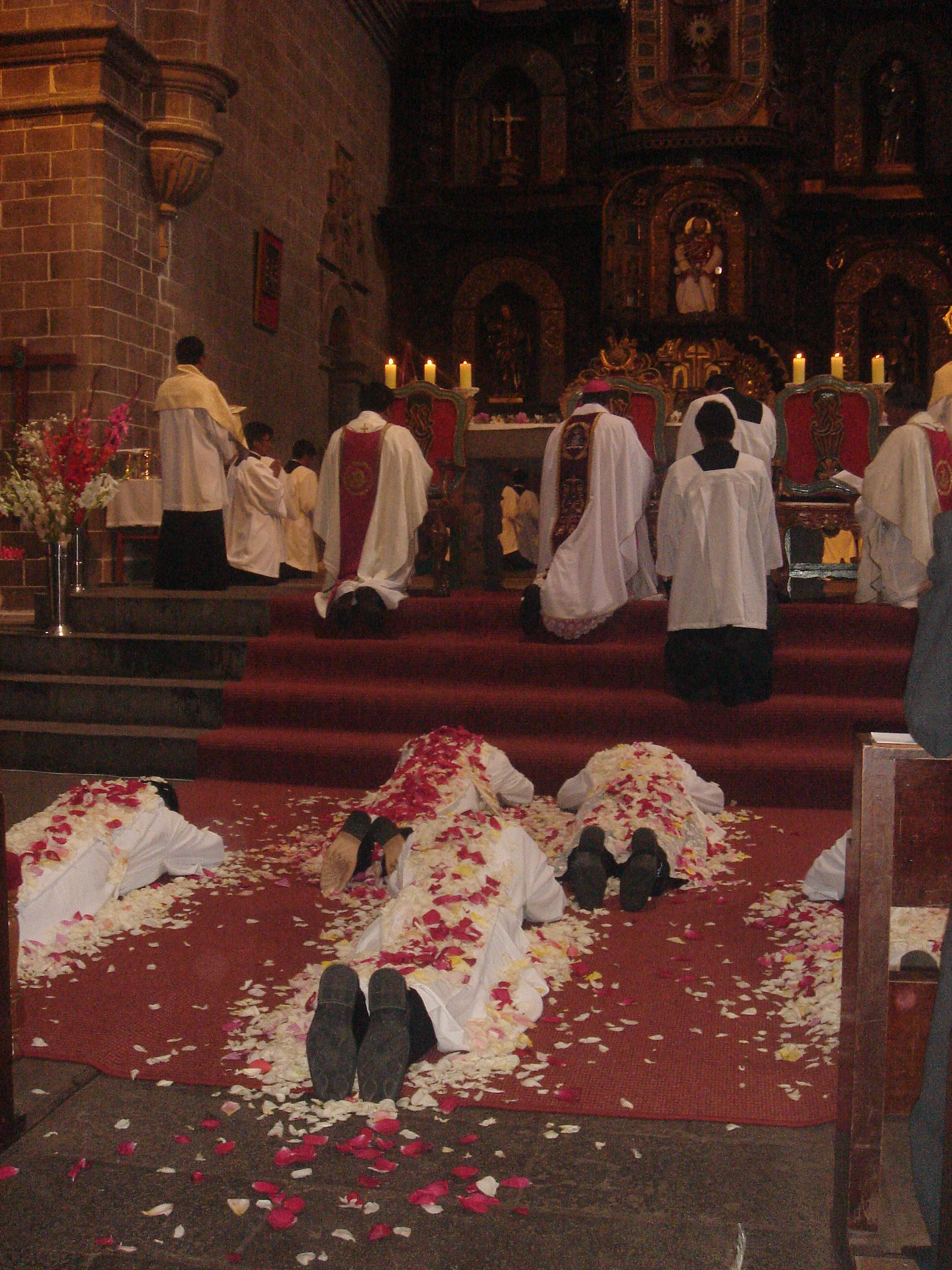
The Litany of the Saints is usually sung during ordination mass when the candidates to be ordained lie prostrate

The definitive version of the Roman Catholic Litany of the Saints is a Latin text published in the Roman Gradual. The current edition was published in 1974, and contains a statement of approval from the Congregation for Divine Worship issued 24 June 1972. The current edition of the Roman Gradual was updated in 1979 to include Neums from Ancient Manuscripts.

The litany is published in five sections. The first contains a short series of invocations of God, beginning with a threefold Kyrie, followed by invocations of God the Father of Heaven, the Son who redeemed the world, the Holy Spirit, and the Holy Trinity.

The second section lists the saints who are to be included, given in the following order. Within each category, men are listed in chronological order, followed by women, also in chronological order. Additional saints, such as the patron of a place or the founder of a religious order, may be inserted in the appropriate place. The official list of recognized saints can be found in the Roman Martyrology.

- The Virgin Mary and the Angels: Mary is invoked three times, as Holy Mary, as Holy Mother of God and as Holy Virgin of Virgins; the following invocations are: Saints Michael, Gabriel and Raphael; all holy angels.
- Patriarchs and Prophets: Abraham; Moses; Elijah; John the Baptist; Joseph; all holy prophets.
- Apostles and disciples: Peter and Paul; Andrew; John and James; Thomas; Matthew; all holy apostles; Luke; Mark; Barnabas; Mary Magdalen; all holy disciples of the Lord.
- Martyrs: Stephen; Ignatius (of Antioch); Polycarp; Justin; Laurence; Cyprian; Boniface; Stanislaus; Thomas (Becket); John (Fisher) and Thomas (More); Paul (Miki); John (de Brebeuf) and Isaac (Jogues); Peter (Chanel); Charles (Lwanga); Perpetua and Felicity; Agnes; Maria (Goretti); all holy martyrs.
- Bishops and Doctors of the Church (popes are not listed distinctly from other non-martyr bishops): Leo and Gregory; Ambrose; Jerome; Augustine; Athanasius; Basil and Gregory (Nazianzen); John Chrysostom; Martin; Patrick; Cyril and Methodius; Charles (Borromeo); Francis (de Sales); Nicholas; Pius (X).
- Priests and Religious [without further distinction between priests, deacons, and lay religious]: Anthony; Benedict; Bernard; Francis and Dominic; Thomas (Aquinas); Ignatius (Loyola); Francis (Xavier); Vincent (de Paul); John-Mary (Vianney); John (Bosco); Catherine (of Siena); Teresa (of Avila); Rose (of Lima)
- Laity: Louis; Monica; Elisabeth (of Hungary); and all saints of God.

Certain names are grouped together by the litany itself (e.g. Michael, Gabriel and Raphael; Francis and Dominic); in the list above, a semi-colon always indicates the next line of the litany. Some priests and religious who are also Doctors of the Church (Catherine of Siena, Teresa of Avila, Bernard of Clairvaux and Thomas Aquinas) are grouped with the "Priests and Religious", rather than with the "Bishops and Doctors". Strict chronological order is not followed in the case of the Jesuit, Francis Xavier (died 1552), who is placed after the founder of the Jesuits, Ignatius Loyola, who died in 1556.

Part three of the litany is a series of petitions to Christ, the first 15 having the response, "free us O Lord", with a further 10 petitions ending "have mercy on us."

The fourth section includes a list of petitions ending te rogamus audi nos ("we beseech you to hear us") from which the appropriate prayers can be chosen for a particular occasion, but always ending with petitions for the whole church, for the ministers of the church, for the lay faithful and for all humanity. The rubrics printed before the litany indicate that other petitions "suitable to the occasion" and in the form proper to the Litany may be added "at the proper place".

The final part of the litany consists of a brief invocation calling on Christ to hear the prayers, and a closing collect.

=== At the Easter Vigil ===
The Litany of the Saints is used prominently at the Easter Vigil, the Mass celebrated on the night before Easter Day. At this Mass, adults who have chosen to become Catholic receive the Sacraments of Initiation in the form of Baptism, or simple Reception, with Confirmation and Holy Communion. Following the readings from Scripture and just before the actual rite of baptism or confirmation, the Litany of the Saints is sung. Even if there is no-one to be baptized, the Litany may be sung for the blessing of holy water in the font. However, if the font is not blessed (i.e. holy water is blessed in a simple container on the sanctuary), the Litany is not used.

The Litany given for the Easter Vigil in the Roman Missal contains a shortened list of saints:

- Holy Mary, Mother of God; Saint Michael; all holy angels; John the Baptist; Joseph; Peter and Paul; Andrew; John; Mary Magdalene; Stephen; Ignatius (of Antioch); Laurence; Perpetua and Felicity; Agnes; Gregory; Augustine; Athanasius; Basil; Martin; Benedict; Francis and Dominic; Ignatius of Loyola; Francis Xavier; John Vianney; Catherine of Siena; Teresa of Jesus (i.e. of Avila); and all holy men and women, Saints of God.

=== At infant baptisms ===
A severely abbreviated form of the litany is given in the official text for the Rite of Baptism of Children. This consists only of the invocations of Mary Mother of God, St John the Baptist, St Joseph, St Peter and St Paul, and all holy men and women, with the addition of saints relevant to the circumstances of the baptism. In the rite the litany is immediately preceded by suggested or ad hoc prayers for the child or children being baptized and family members present, and immediately followed by a prayer of minor exorcism.

An extended form of the litany is also permitted for baptisms, beginning with a Kyrie, and followed by the same selection of saints used for the Easter Vigil (as listed above). The saints are followed by brief invocations of Christ and then petitions which include "Give new life to these chosen ones by the grace of baptism".

=== At the election of a pope ===
An expanded list is also specified in the ritual Ordo Rituum Conclavis for use during the conclave for the election of a new pope. The additional saints are, in italics:

- Among apostles, following Thomas: Philip and James; Bartholomew; Matthew; Simon and Jude; Matthias
- Among martyrs, following Cyprian: Frumentius, Stanislaus, Boniface, Thomas (Becket); John (Fisher) and Thomas (More); Josaphat, Paul Miki...; Agnes; Nina, Maria (Goretti).
- Among bishops and doctors, following John Chrysostom: Ephrem the Syrian; Gregory the Illuminator; Martin...
- Among priests and religious, following Bernard: Maurus; Francis; Dominic...

=== In other ceremonies ===
The Litany of the Saints is also prescribed for ordination (different saints are added corresponding to the different grades of ordained ministry), religious profession, the blessing of an abbot, and the dedication of churches and altars.

In the Latin version of the Litany, the names of one or more saints are chanted by a cantor or choir, and the congregants reply with either, Ora pro nobis (if one saint is addressed) or Orate pro nobis (using the plural imperative form of the verb, if more than one saint is addressed). Both responses translate to "Pray for us." However, it is permissible to personalize the Litany of the Saints for a funeral rite or other Mass for the dead. When this was done during the funerals of Popes John Paul II, Benedict XVI, and Francis the response was Ora[te] pro eo, or "Pray for him."

A Vatican recommendation issued in 1988 proposes that the Litany can be appropriately used for the beginning of the Mass of the First Sunday of Lent, to offer a distinguishing mark for the beginning of Lent.

The iBreviary website offers a text in English of the full Litany of the Saints expanded with many additional saints, drawn in part from the bespoke litanies for particular liturgical occasions. It includes a note that in ceremonies involving the pope, the canonized popes are moved from their usual place to form part of an expanded list of popes prior to other bishops and doctors.

=== Indulgence ===
The 2004 Enchiridion Indulgentiarum grants the partial indulgence to the faithful who piously pray the litany.

== Pre-Vatican II practice ==
In the late 1960s, Roman Catholic liturgical texts were changed according to the directives of Sacrosanctum Concilium, a key document of the Second Vatican Council. The texts in use immediately prior to the Council, those of 1962, may still be used today by priests of the Latin Church under the conditions indicated in articles 4 and 5 of the 2021 motu proprio Traditionis custodes.

The form of the litany in use prior to the Council is given in the Roman Ritual, published in a Latin-English edition in 1952. The Catholic Encyclopedia article available online entirely reflects pre-Vatican II usage.

This Litany of the Saints begins with a threefold Kyrie, followed (as in the current version) by invocations of God the Father of Heaven, the Son who redeemed the world, the Holy Spirit, and the Holy Trinity. The names of the saints follow:

- The Virgin Mary is invoked three times, as Holy Mary, as Holy Mother of God and as Holy Virgin of Virgins; then Saints Michael; Gabriel; Raphael; all holy angels and archangels; all the holy order of blessed spirits.
- Patriarchs and Prophets: beginning with Saint John the Baptist (then other names, if they are to be inserted) and always ending with Saint Joseph; all holy patriarchs and prophets.
- Apostles and disciples: Peter; Paul; Andrew; James; John; Thomas; James; Philip; Bartholomew; Matthew; Simon; Thaddeus; Matthias; Barnabas; Luke; Mark; all holy apostles and evangelists; all holy disciples of the Lord; all the Holy Innocents.
- Martyrs: Stephen; Laurence; Vincent; Fabian and Sebastian; John and Paul; Cosmas and Damian; Gervasius and Protasius; all holy martyrs.
- Bishops and Doctors of the Church: Sylvester; Gregory; Ambrose; Augustine; Jerome; Martin; Nicholas; all holy bishops and confessors; all holy Doctors.
- Priests and male religious (without further distinction between priests, deacons, and lay religious): Anthony; Benedict; Bernard; Dominic; Francis; all holy priests and Levites; all holy monks and hermits.
- Female saints, ordered as the men were above: Mary Magdalene; Agatha; Lucy; Agnes; Cecilia; Catherine (of Alexandria); Anastasia; all holy virgins and widows; all holy saints of God.

Notable, in contrast with the post-Vatican II version, non-religious laypersons (post-Early Christianity) are not commemorated individually under this standard form.

The litany then twice pleads with God to be merciful, and this is followed by 21 invocations for which the response is Libera nos, Domine ("O Lord, deliver us"), then 17 petitions with the response Te rogamus, audi nos ("We beseech thee, hear us"). The final part of the litany consists of seven invocations of Christ, the first three under the title "Lamb of God".
