= Cristina Bergoglio =

Argentine painter, writer and architect (born 1967)

- Born: 25 August 1967 (age 58); Córdoba, Argentina
- Education: National University of Córdoba
- Occupations: Painter; architect; writer
- Relatives: Pope Francis (uncle)

Cristina Bergoglio (born 25 August 1967) is an Argentine painter, writer and architect, and the niece of the late Pope Francis.

== Career ==
Born in Córdoba, Argentina, Bergoglio studied at the Taller de Pintura de María Finochietti in Argentina from 1983 to 1986, and received her Titulación Superior (higher qualifications) in urban architecture from the National University of Córdoba in 1996. Her first exhibitions were in the late 1980s. In 1997, she moved to Spain, where she attended the Taller de Pintura Emma Gans in Madrid, and the Taller del Prado academy in Madrid, later becoming a teacher at that institution, until 2007.

Her paintings tend to portray large metropolises such as New York City, Miami, Porto, London, and Madrid, and she usually works with acrylic and oil painting techniques. In June, 2014, her works were displayed in an exhibit at the Conrad Hotel in the Brickell neighborhood of Miami. In 2017, she was one of twenty artists with works featured in a charitable exhibit and auction at the Thyssen-Bornemisza Museum, and in 2018, her works were shown at the Doorway Gallery in Dublin, Ireland. Her showing in Dublin, including paintings of the city that she had prepared for the occasion, coincided with a visit to Ireland by Pope Francis, though the gallery exhibition was planned a year before the Pope's visit was announced.

In 2019, Bergoglio was the subject of a documentary short, Escribir con el pincel (Write with the brush) screened at the Academy of Cinematographic Arts and Sciences of Spain. In 2020, she was one of eleven artists to be included in an exhibition titled "Once de 10" at Espacio 36 in Zamora, Spain.

In addition to painting and teaching, she has written pieces for several magazines, and published several books, Vivir renaciendo (Live Reborn), The 20 Freedoms of Being, Entrar en lo extraordinario en tiempos del corona (Go into the Extraordinary in Times of Coronavirus), and Y que la ciudad sea contigo (May the City Be with You).

== Personal life ==
As of 2020, Bergoglio resides in Spain. She has described herself as spiritual but not religious, and has stated, "I'm not afraid to say I see the church as outdated, and that's why I believe life has put my uncle to renew this certain system of thought that was getting stagnated".

In an interview, she indicated that she only met Pope Francis once, where she "gifted him with a painting of the city of Assisi in Italy", and that she had not sought to meet him again out of "respect [for] his job as a spiritual messenger", and due to her own busy schedule. After Pope Francis died on 21 April 2025, Bergoglio and other family members chose not to attend his funeral, reportedly out of respect for his view that their resources would be better spent charitably.
