= Hoffman Point (Antarctica) =

Headland in Antarctica

Coordinates: 79°20′S 160°30′E

Hoffman Point is an ice-covered coastal headland at the south side of the mouth of Bertoglio Glacier, where the latter flows into the Ross Ice Shelf, Antarctica. It was mapped by the U.S. Geological Survey from tellurometer surveys and Navy air photos, 1959–63, and named by the Advisory Committee on Antarctic Names for Commander G.L. Hoffman, Civil Engineer Corps, U.S. Navy, commander of Mobile Construction Battalion Eight at McMurdo Station in U.S. Navy Operation Deep Freeze 1964.
