= Bertoglio =

Bertoglio is a surname. Notable people with the surname include:

- Edo Bertoglio (born 1951), Swiss photographer and film director
- Facundo Bertoglio (born 1990), Argentine footballer
- Fausto Bertoglio (born 1949), Italian cyclist

== See also ==
- Bertoglio Glacier, glacier of Antarctica
