= Death and funeral of Pope Francis =

2025 funeral of head of the Catholic Church

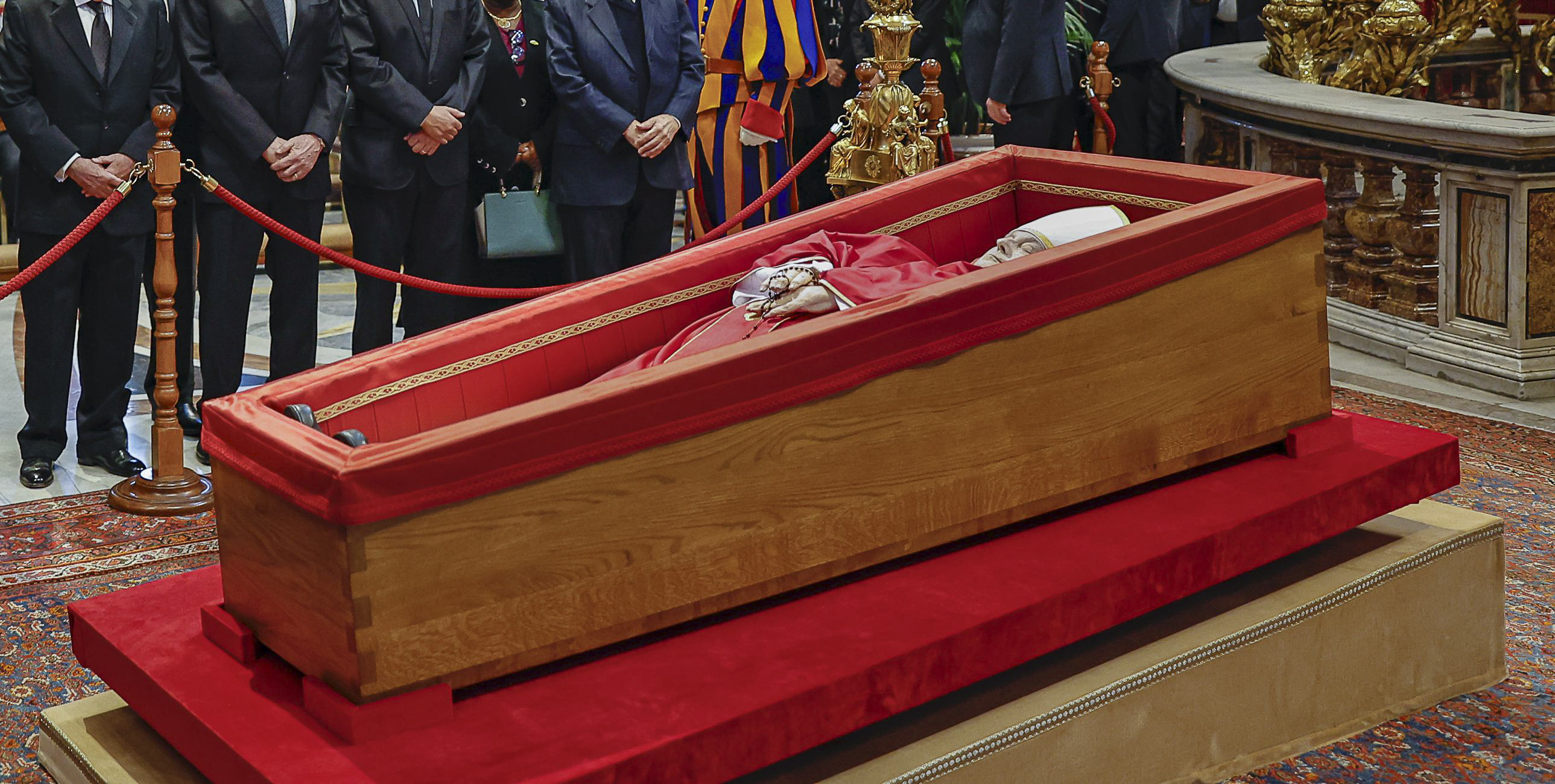
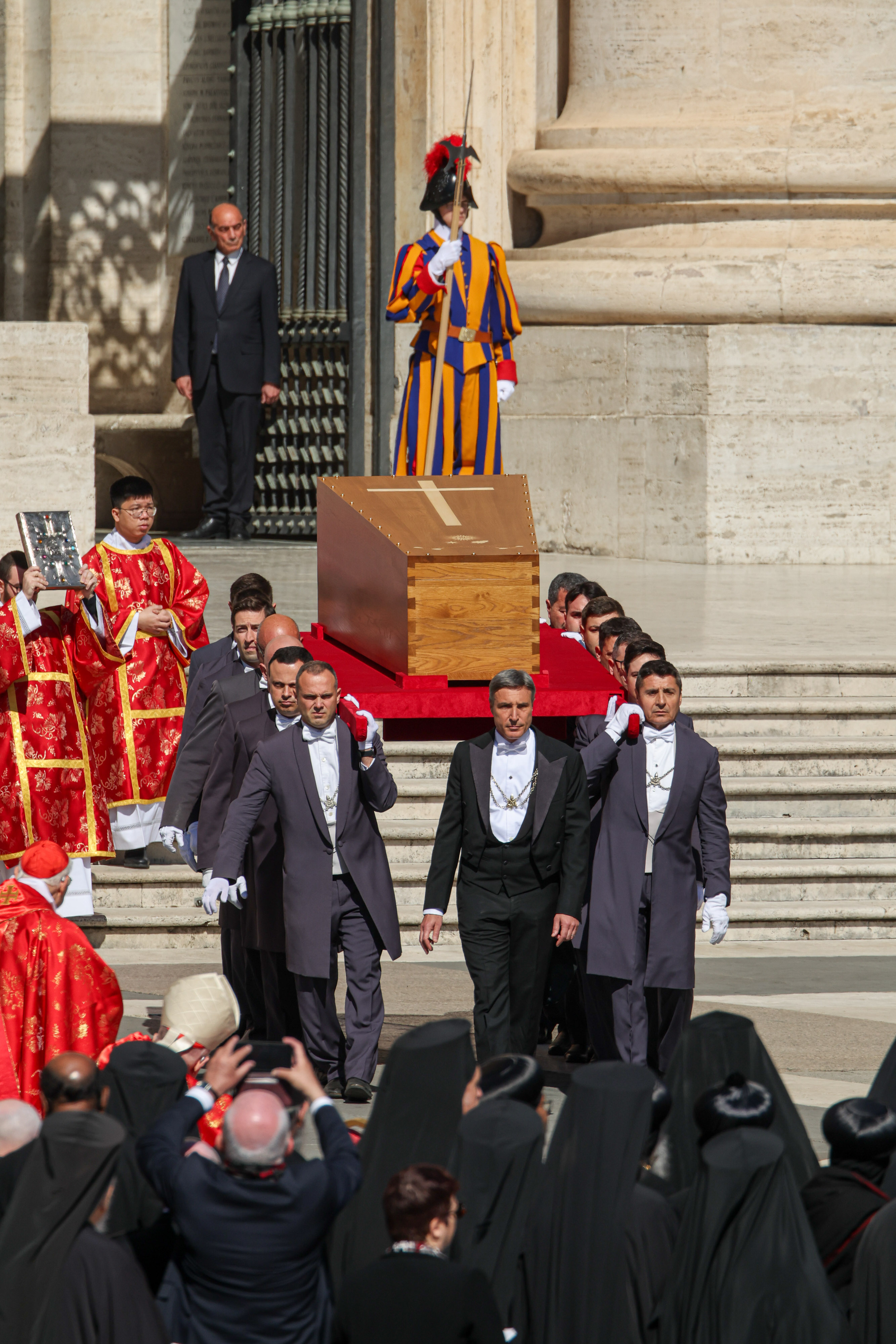
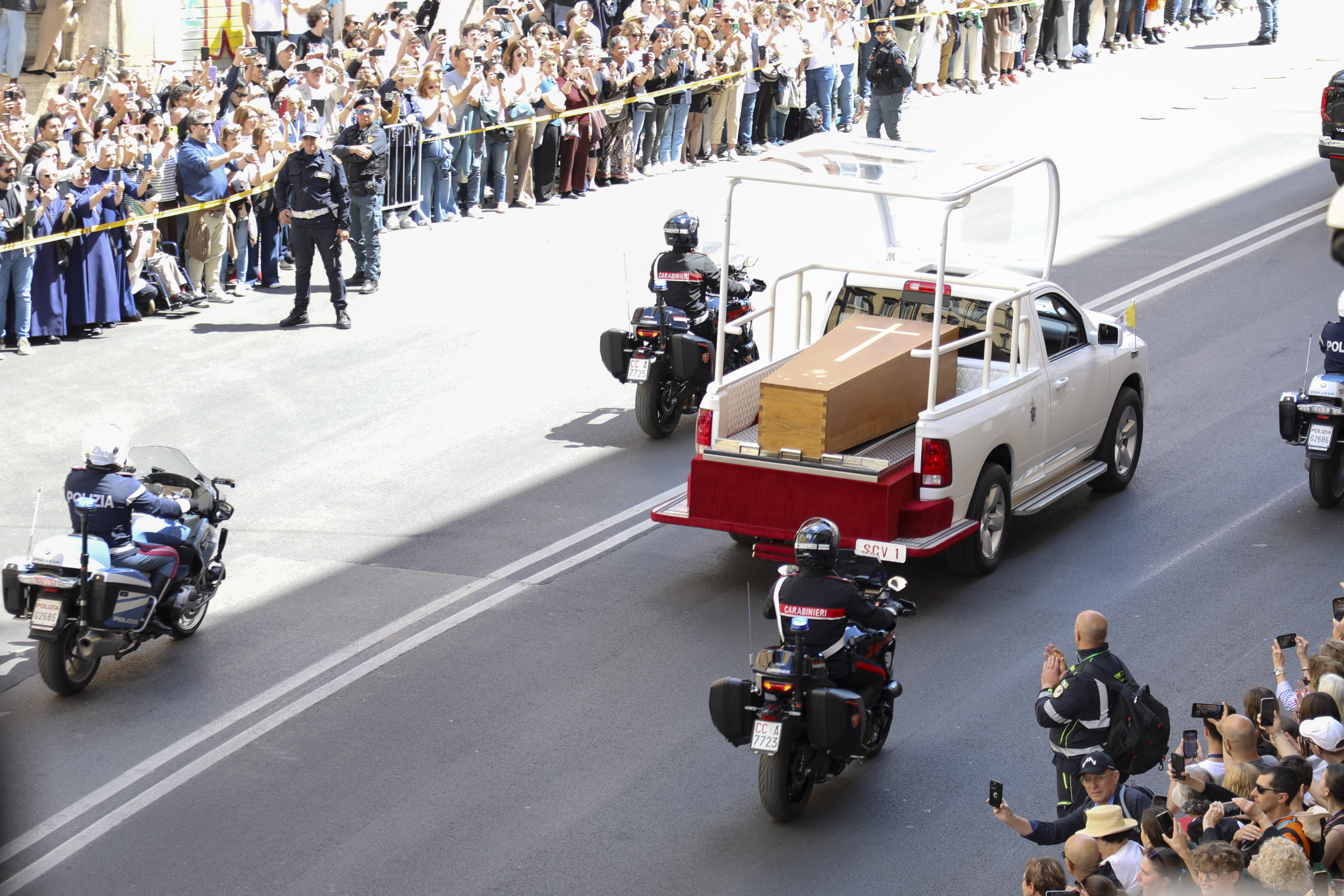
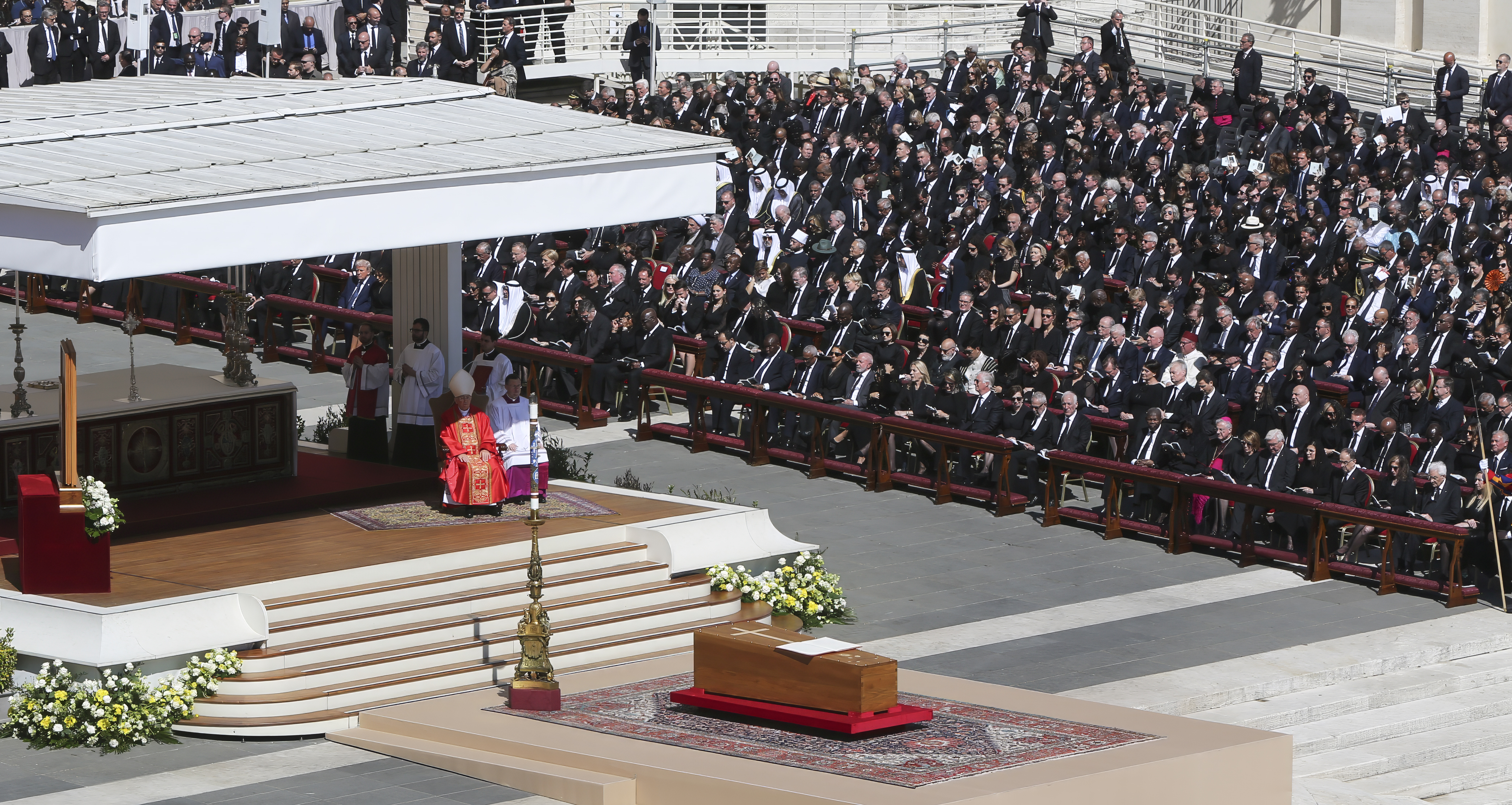
- Top: Body of Pope Francis lying in state; Left: Procession of the Pope's coffin; Right: Transport to Santa Maria Maggiore; Bottom: Funeral Mass on the parvise
- Date: 21 April 2025 (death); 26 April 2025 (funeral and burial)
- Location: Domus Sanctae Marthae, Vatican City (death); St. Peter's Square, Vatican City (funeral); Santa Maria Maggiore, Rome, Italy (burial); 41°54′03″N 12°27′12″E
- Participants: College of Cardinals (led by Cardinal Giovanni Battista Re); Various dignitaries worldwide

On 21 April 2025 (Easter Monday), at 07:35 CEST (UTC+2), Pope Francis died at the age of 88 at Domus Sanctae Marthae in Vatican City. His death was announced by Cardinal Kevin Farrell, the camerlengo, in a broadcast by Vatican Media and in a video statement at 09:45 on the same day. Francis had served as pope, the head of the Catholic Church, for twelve years since his election on 13 March 2013.

Francis's death followed a five-week stay in hospital a month earlier, where he suffered from a respiratory tract infection and double pneumonia. The cause of his death was officially registered as a stroke followed by irreversible cardiac arrest. Francis's Requiem Mass was celebrated on 26 April, five days after his death, and he was buried at Santa Maria Maggiore. The consequent conclave, which began on 7 May, elected Robert Francis Prevost as Francis's successor, who took the papal name Leo XIV, and was inaugurated on 18 May.

== Background ==
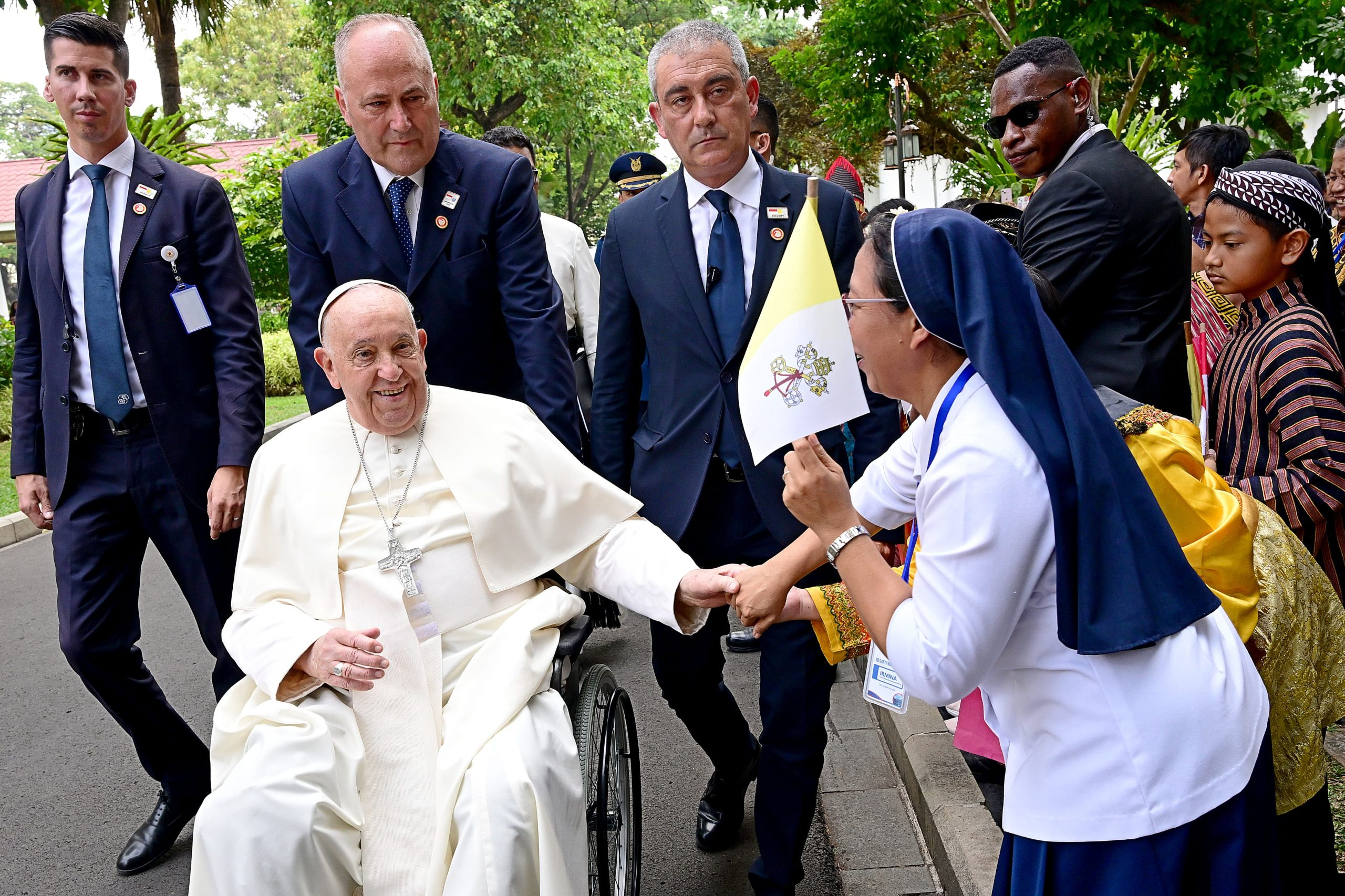
Francis in a wheelchair during his trip to Indonesia, September 2024

Elected in March 2013 at the age of 76, Francis was then reported to be healthy despite having suffered from chronic lung damage, due in part to the lung excision he had as a young man. His doctors had said the lung tissue removed then would not significantly affect his health. The only concern would be decreased respiratory reserve if he had a respiratory infection. In the last few years of his life, he was prone to bouts of influenza and bronchitis in the winter. Knee problems and sciatica had prompted him to frequently use a wheelchair, walker, or cane.

In 2021, Francis's health problems prompted rumours that he might resign, which Francis dismissed. However, Francis confirmed in 2022 that he had prepared a resignation letter in the first year of his pontificate, in the event he needed to abdicate his position due to illness "impeding his work" as pope. The sealed letter was given to Tarcisio Bertone, the Cardinal Secretary of State at the time. In June 2022, after undergoing treatment to his knee, Francis cancelled planned trips to the Democratic Republic of the Congo and South Sudan. In an interview with Reuters that month, Francis said that he had not considered resigning but would do so if his health made it impossible for him to run the Church. During his eventual trip to the Democratic Republic of the Congo in February 2023, Francis said that resignation was "not in his agenda at the moment".

In March 2023, Francis was hospitalized in Rome with a respiratory infection. He returned to celebrate the Easter Vigil Mass on Holy Saturday, in April. In June, Francis underwent abdominal surgery after suffering from a hernia. Francis had publicly used a wheelchair since 2022, initially due to persistent knee pain which required an operation. He acknowledged that his recurring mobility problems had precipitated the beginning of what Reuters termed "a new, slower phase of his papacy", although he was praised by disabled Catholics for making his "disability part of his visible identity".

== Last days and death ==
=== Final illness ===
On 14 February 2025, Francis entered Gemelli Hospital in Rome due to bronchitis. His hospital stay was extended due to a polymicrobial infection of his respiratory tract and bilateral pneumonia. Vatican News described his condition as critical and reported that he was given blood transfusions and high-flow oxygen. On 23 February, it was announced that Francis had early-stage kidney failure, though his condition remained "under control". On 26 February, he showed slight improvement, but suffered a bronchial spasm two days later, causing him to inhale vomit and require non-invasive mechanical ventilation, with the Vatican stating that his prognosis remained guarded. On 3 March, it was reported that he had been removed from mechanical ventilation and was recovering. The Vatican disclosed that Francis had suffered two episodes of "acute respiratory insufficiency". After this episode, the third major downturn in the Pope's condition, mechanical ventilation was resumed that afternoon.

On 19 March, it was reported that Francis was no longer using mechanical ventilation at night, with his doctors stating that his lung infection was under control, although not eliminated. He was discharged from hospital on 23 March, immediately after blessing a crowd from his balcony; he was expected to spend at least two months recuperating at his home at Domus Sanctae Marthae in Vatican City, maintaining a reduced work schedule. He appeared in public for the first time since the hospitalization on 6 April.

On Easter Sunday, 20 April, Francis met with United States vice president JD Vance to exchange Easter greetings. Francis delegated the traditional Easter Mass to Cardinal Angelo Comastri, but made a public appearance to personally bestow the Urbi et Orbi blessing, and to meet people in his popemobile in St. Peter's Square. The last political official to meet with Pope Francis was Croatian prime minister Andrej Plenković. His final spoken words were a message of thanks to his nurse, Massimiliano Strappetti, for allowing him to appear in St. Peter's Square. Francis then rested that afternoon and had dinner.

=== Death ===
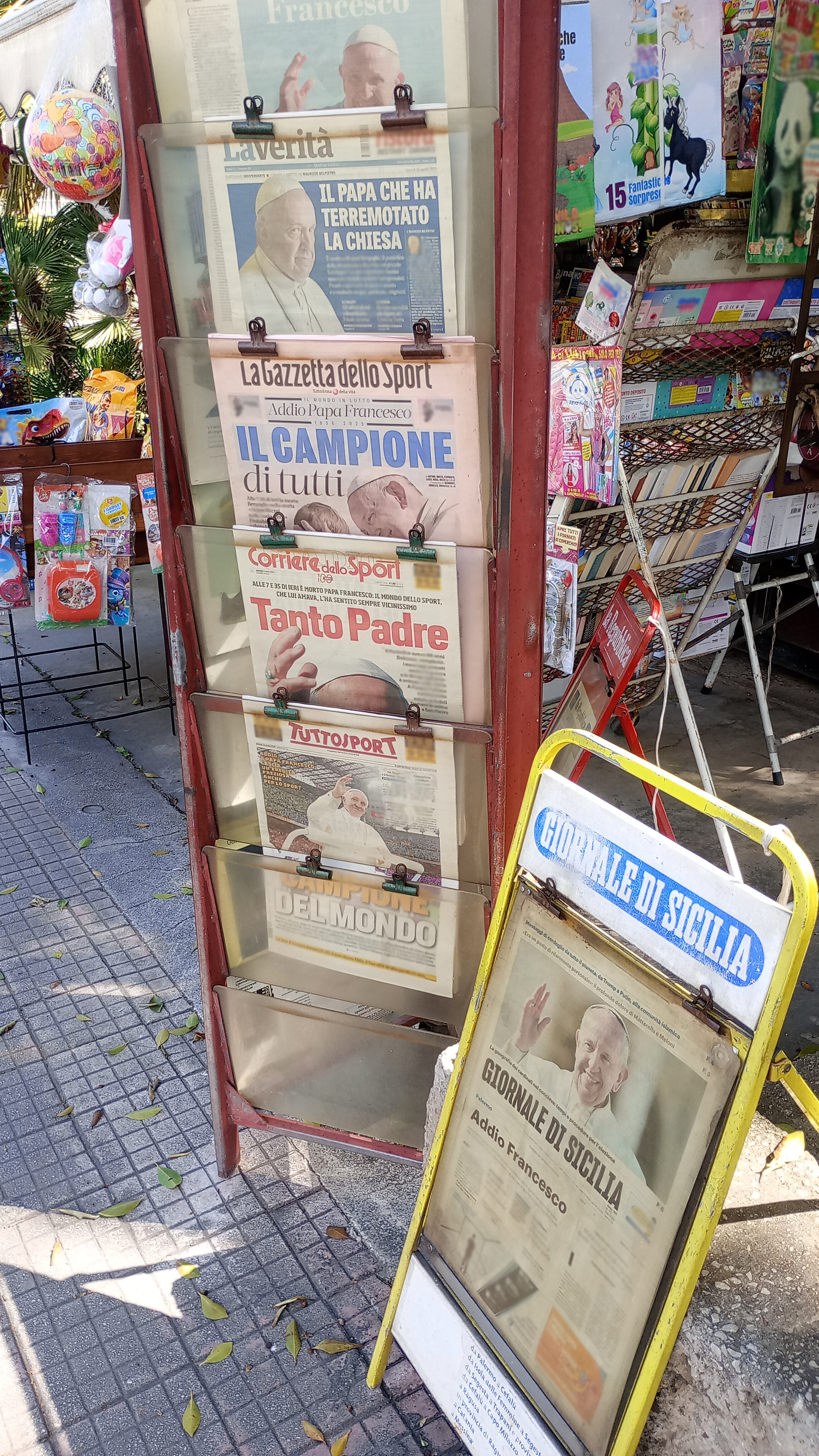
Italian newspapers on display with the coverage of the Pope's death in a newsagent in Sicily.

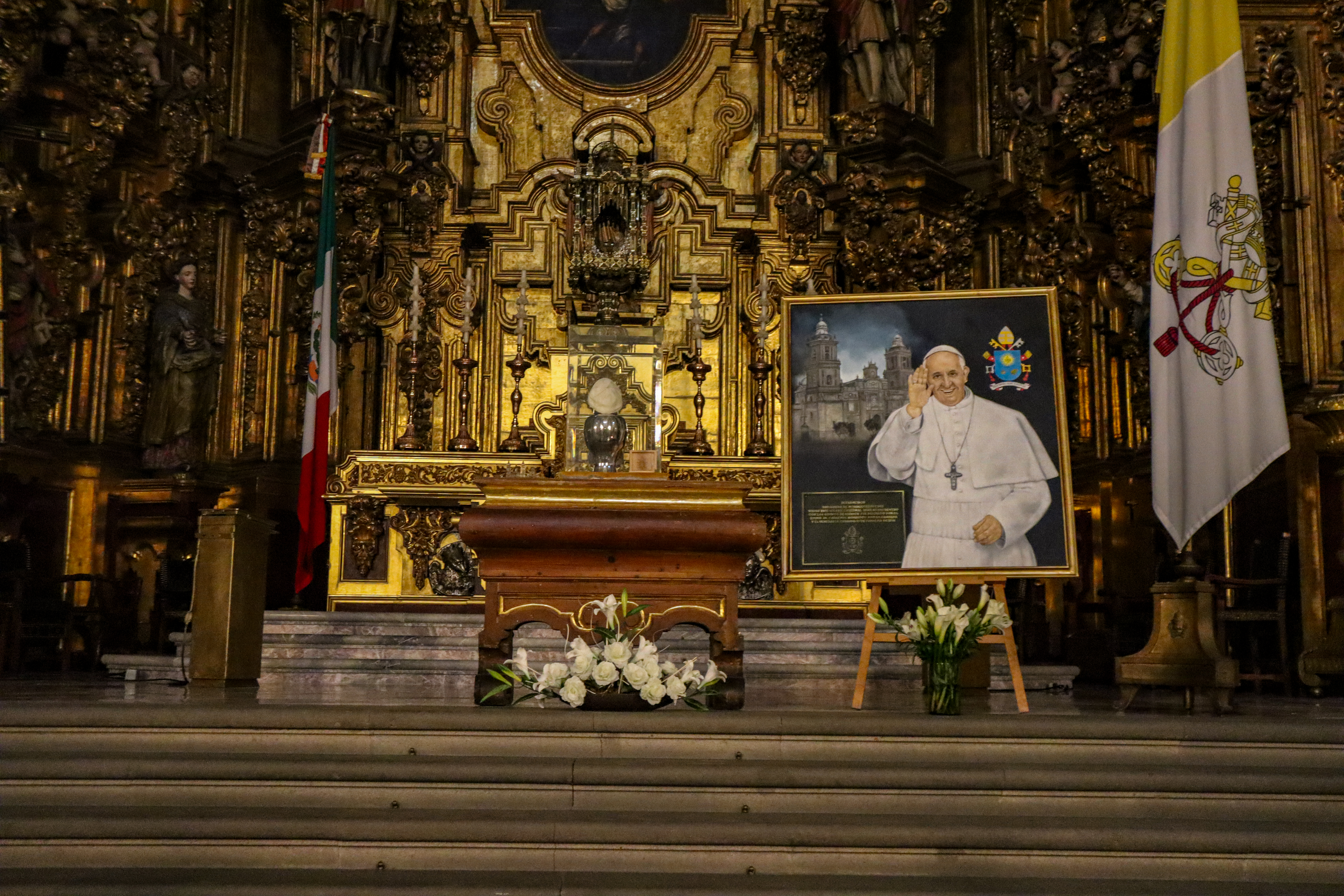
Display case showing a zucchetto worn by the Pope at the Altar of the Kings in the Mexico City Metropolitan Cathedral. The zucchetto was a gift after his visit to the temple in 2016.

Francis's health began a sudden deterioration at 05:30 CEST on the morning of 21 April (Easter Monday), during which he made a gesture toward his nurse Massimiliano Strappetti. His physician, Sergio Alfieri, was immediately summoned. He found the pope, eyes opened and breathing normally but unresponsive to stimuli. A severe stroke was quickly diagnosed. After brief discussion, it was decided against transporting Francis to the hospital, as it was believed that the pope's condition was fatal and nothing further could be done. There was no sign of physical anguish.

Francis died at 07:35, at his residence in Vatican City, aged 88. His death was announced by Camerlengo Kevin Farrell, in a statement broadcast on Vatican Media from the chapel of the papal residence at Domus Sanctae Marthae. A death certificate released by the Vatican later that day confirmed that he had died of a stroke, which led to a coma and irreversible cardiac arrest. His death certificate also noted that he was suffering from type 2 diabetes and hypertension.

Later on 21 April, the papal apartments at the Apostolic Palace, and Francis's personal apartment at Domus Sanctae Marthae, were sealed by the Cardinal Camerlengo.

On 22 April, the Vatican released the first images of Francis lying in state at the Domus Sanctae Marthae chapel, wearing his papal mitre, a pallium, red vestments, and his regular black shoes. Carmela "Carmelina" Mancuso was the only layperson who was allowed to present her respects to the pontiff while he remained in the chapel.

Following his death, Francis's spiritual testament, dated 29 June 2022, was released, revealing his wish to be buried at the Basilica of Santa Maria Maggiore, specifically "in the burial niche in the side aisle between the Pauline Chapel (Chapel of the Salus Populi Romani) and the Sforza Chapel of the Basilica." His last will ended: "May the Lord grant a fitting reward to all those who have loved me and who continue to pray for me. The suffering that has marked the final part of my life, I offer to the Lord, for peace in the world and for fraternity among peoples."

Sixty cardinals held an organizational meeting on 22 April. On 23 April at 09:00, Francis' remains were moved from Domus Sanctae Marthae to St. Peter's Basilica to lie in state for a three-day public viewing which occurred from 11:00 at the same date until 19:00 on 25 April. Over 19,000 people came to view Francis within the first eight and a half hours of his lying in state, with queues reaching up to Via della Conciliazione. By that evening, the number of attendees had reached 90,000, prompting officials to shorten closing time to 1.5 hours for cleaning on the morning of 24 April and open the basilica all night afterwards. By 25 April, the number had reached more than 250,000. French-Argentine nun Geneviève Jeanningros, a personal friend of Pope Francis, was let unusually close to his coffin to pay her respects.

On 28 April, one week after his death, it was confirmed that the conclave to elect Francis's successor would convene on 7 May. Robert Francis Prevost succeeded Francis on 8 May after his election following four rounds of voting, taking the papal name of Leo XIV.

== Funeral ==
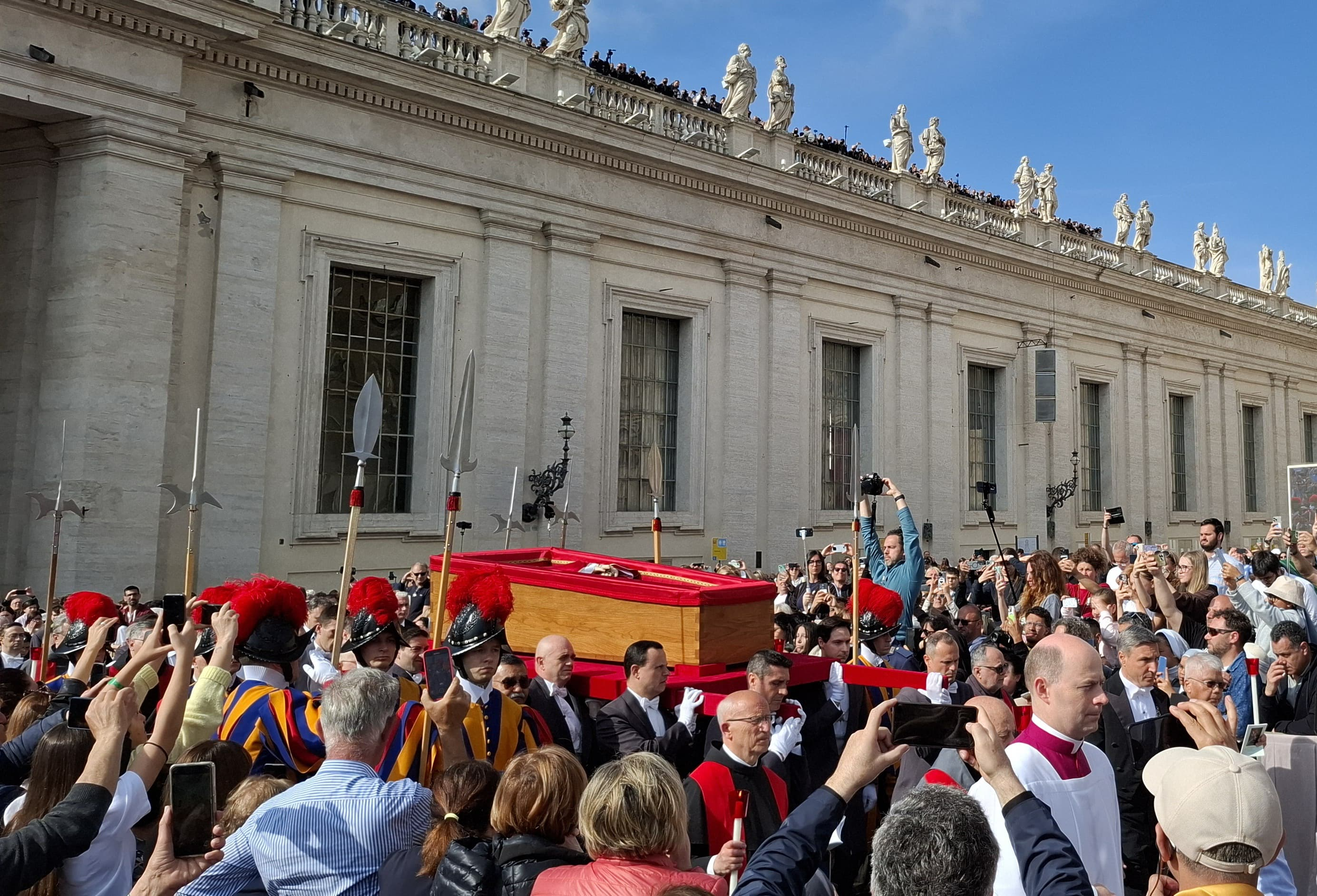
Procession of the body of Pope Francis with his coffin carried by papal gentlemen while being guarded by Franciscans and Swiss Guards

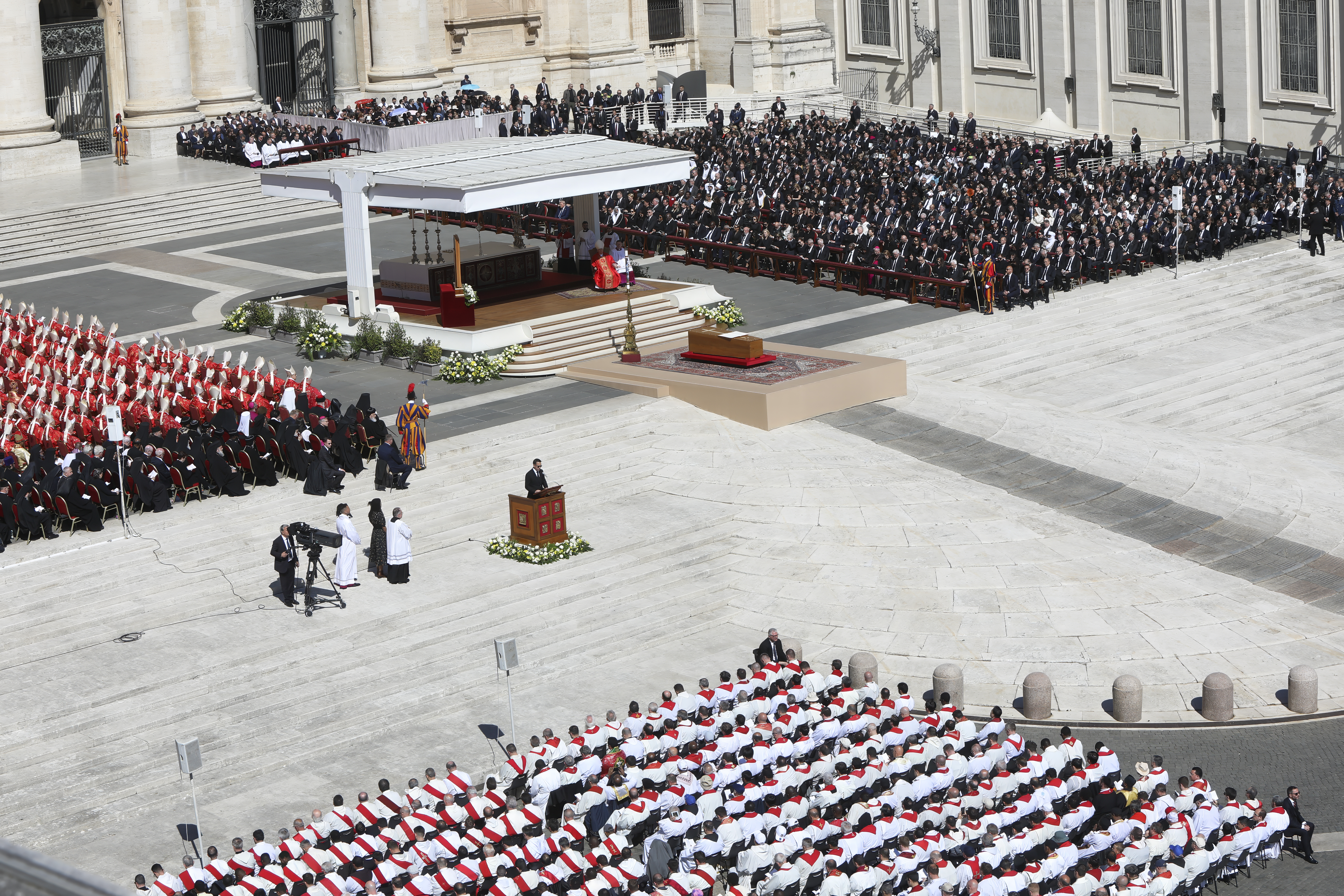
St. Peter's Square during the funeral. National dignitaries are seated at the top-right, with cardinals and bishops on the opposite side. Other Catholic clergy members are seated at the bottom

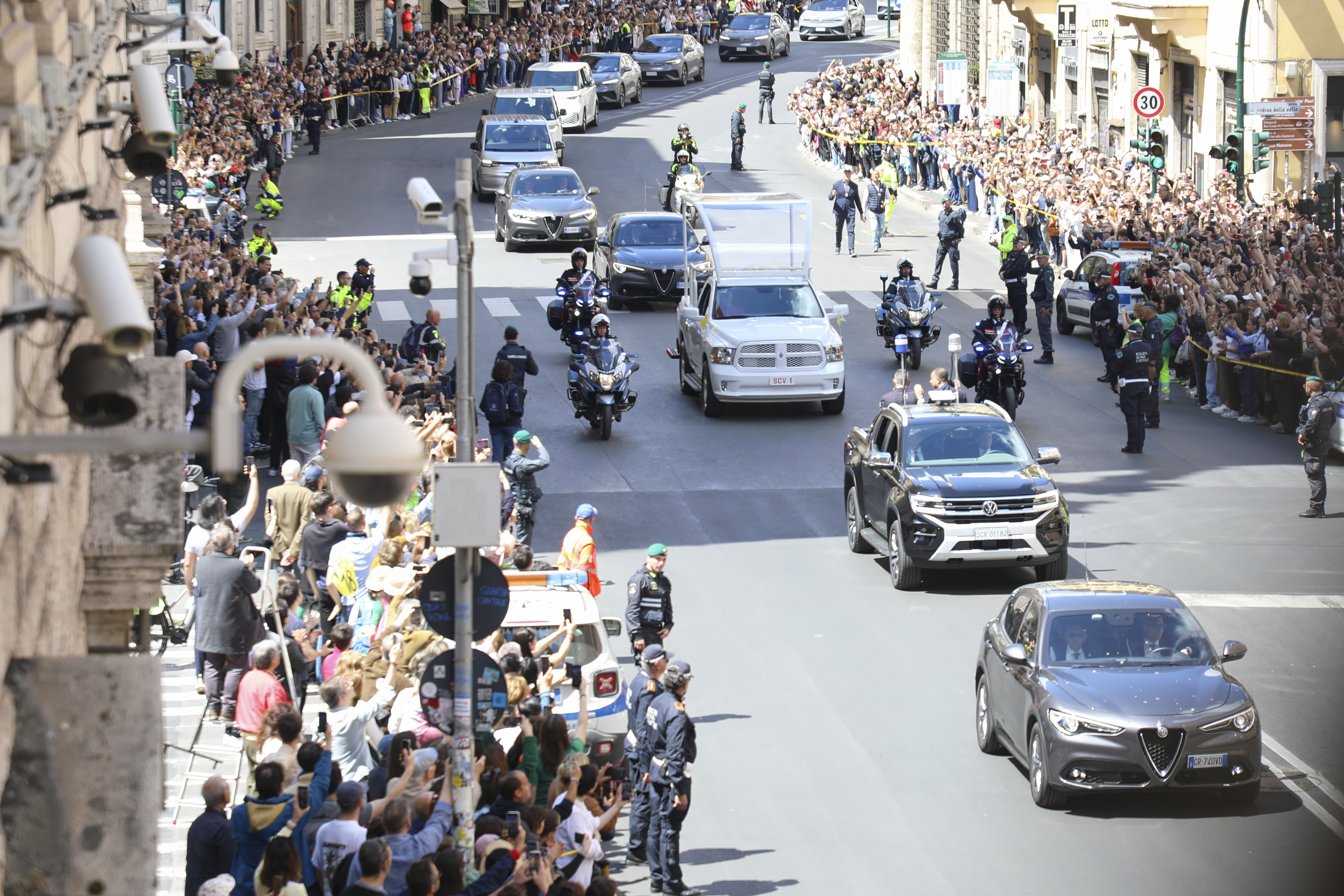
The funeral cortege in the streets of Rome.

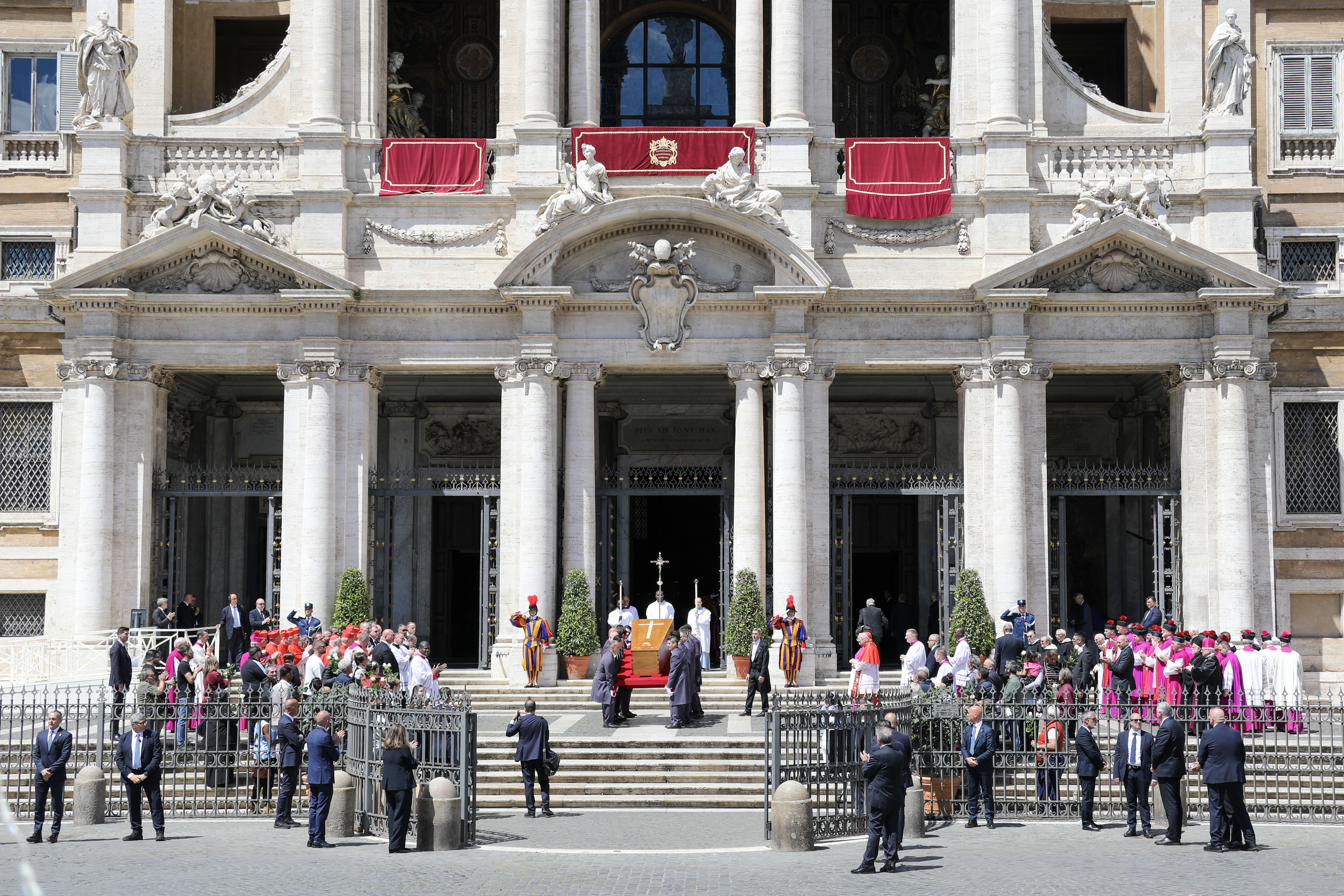
The casket arrives at Santa Maria Maggiore.

Proceedings began with the Camerlengo, Kevin Farrell, presiding over the rite of ascertainment of death in the papal chapel. A papal funeral has traditionally been an elaborate affair, but Francis approved plans to simplify the rubric of the Ordo Exsequiarum Romani Pontificis, the liturgical book detailing the rites of a papal funeral. He opted for a basic wooden coffin lined with zinc and ended the tradition of popes being buried in three coffins (cypress, lead, and oak) and placing the pope's body on a raised platform for public viewing.

On 25 April, Francis's coffin was sealed during a liturgical rite which began an hour after the lying in state ended. Controversy broke out after Roger Mahony, the former Archbishop of Los Angeles who was relieved of his office in 2013 due to mishandling of clerical sexual abuse, played a role in the ceremonies as the senior cardinal-priest in Rome, closing the lid of the papal coffin. A text summarising the pope's life (rogitum) was placed in his coffin. After the Litany of the Saints, the patriarchs, archbishops, and metropolitans of the Eastern Catholic Churches stood beside the coffin of Pope Francis for the Supplicatio Ecclesiae Orientalium (formerly known as the Officio Defectorum in Byzantine liturgy). After thrice chanting the Paschal troparion and chanting prayers, Patriarch Youssef Absi censed the coffin.

The Requiem Mass took place on 26 April at 10:00, led by the Dean of the College of Cardinals, Cardinal Giovanni Battista Re. Roughly 130 foreign delegations were confirmed at the funeral by the Vatican, including several prominent world leaders and heads of state. Around 250,000 people were estimated to have attended the funeral Mass at St. Peter's Square, while 140,000 lined up to see the funeral procession in Rome. The day of the funeral was also the first day of the novendiales, a nine-day mourning period during which the cardinals concelebrated Mass in Francis's memory. The Office for the Liturgical Celebrations of the Supreme Pontiff released the schedule and the list of cardinals who would officiate the Masses for the novendiales.

The Italian government mobilized more than 2,500 police officers and 1,500 soldiers to provide security during the funeral. It also deployed a naval vessel off the coast of Rome, and placed fighter jet squadrons on standby. A no-fly zone was imposed over Rome ahead of the funeral.

The seating order at the funeral was based on a class division by the ranking of dignitaries (e.g. reigning monarchs, non-royal heads of state, or heads of government). Within each class, the arrangement was further ordered alphabetically based on the official French names of each participating country – French being the main language of international diplomacy. An exception was made for the presidents of Argentina (Javier Milei), Francis's native country, and Italy (Sergio Mattarella), who were both given precedence over other dignitaries.

The funeral offered a chance for "brush-by" diplomatic encounters between leaders, including US president Donald Trump and Ukrainian president Volodymyr Zelenskyy, who met at St. Peter's Basilica ahead of the funeral.

== Burial ==
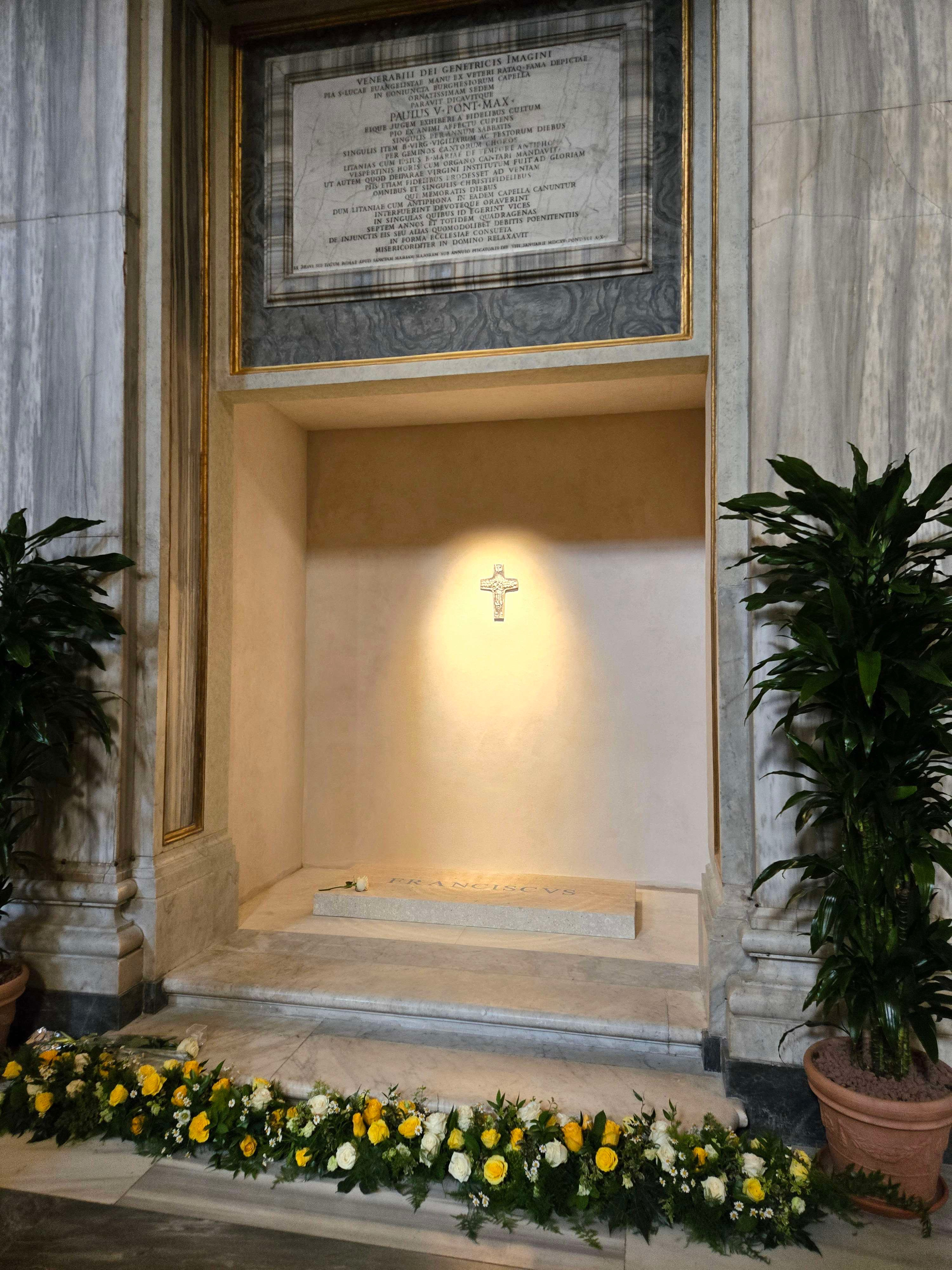
Francis's tomb inside Santa Maria Maggiore.

Francis was buried in the Santa Maria Maggiore in Rome "in the burial niche in the side aisle between the Pauline Chapel (Chapel of the Salus Populi Romani) and the Sforza Chapel of the Basilica". He had a "great devotion" to the Salus Populi Romani icon kept in that church. He became the eighth pope to be buried in the Basilica and the first since Clement IX in 1669, as well as the first pope interred outside Vatican City since Pope Leo XIII in 1903.

The coffin was transferred from the Vatican to the Santa Maria Maggiore via a procession using a Ram 1500-based popemobile. The route took him across the Tiber on the Ponte Principe Amedeo Savoia Aosta bridge, down the Corso Vittorio Emanuele II, past the Church of the Gesù (mother church of the Jesuits), over the Piazza Venezia, along the Via dei Fori Imperiali, past the Colosseum, up the Via Labicana in the direction of the Archbasilica of Saint John Lateran (seat of the Bishop of Rome), before turning left onto the Via Merulana towards the Santa Maria Maggiore.

As the coffin was carried up the stairs of the Basilica, forty mourners from poor and marginalized communities – including prisoners on day release, human trafficking victims, transgender women, migrants, sex workers, and homeless people – greeted the coffin.

Francis's name on the simple marble grave marker was marred by irregular kerning (spacing) of the letters; the misalignment was observed by typographers and design experts.

On 27 April, the Second Sunday of Easter, members of the College of Cardinals visited Pope Francis's tomb, where they said the evening Second Vespers prayer. During the 12th general congregation of the College of Cardinals on 6 May 2025, Pope Francis's fisherman's ring and lead seal were destroyed.

== Reactions ==
Following Francis's death, many political and religious leaders across the world offered condolences and paid tribute. Several countries also declared periods of national mourning for Pope Francis.

== See also ==
- Death and funeral of Pope John Paul II
- Death and funeral of Pope Benedict XVI
