= Spiritual testament =

A spiritual testament is a devotional practice for Catholics. Based on the generic format of a legal document ("last will"), the texts are a way of bidding farewell (for now) and accentuating the recently deceased person's religious convictions.

Some consider St. Paul's letters to Timothy and Titus to be his spiritual testament, since he gives instructions about keeping apostolic faith. St. Francis of Assisi wrote one to his brethren when he felt death approaching in 1226. One of the most famous spiritual testaments is that of Saint Charles Borromeo (originally titled The Testament or Last Will of the Soul). The bishop wrote it during an epidemic and designed it as a sort of spiritual insurance policy to declare his true faith to God and protect his soul from the devil if he were to die suddenly or lose his mental faculties before receiving the last rites.

Pope St. John XXIII wrote a "Spiritual Testament and Final Dispositions," published in Journey of a Soul in 1964, after his death. St. John Paul II wrote his last will and testament, inspired by spiritual writings of Pope St. Paul VI, soon after becoming pope. The first version was dated "Rome, 6 March 1979," but the pontiff often revisited the text and adapted it. His wish to be buried without a coffin, directly in the earth, was not followed.

Most spiritual testaments record their authors' allegiance to Jesus Christ and the Roman Catholic Church, willingness to repent of their sins, and desire to remain faithful until they die, come what may. Ideally, believers would sign it while in good health, seeking to ensure that even if they recanted under delirium on their deathbed, God would know of their true intentions. They often contain details about how the deceased wants to be buried. Other frequent tropes are: readiness for death, forgiveness of enemies, and pre-emptive rejection of any deathbed temptations or doubts.

Reading and meditation upon spiritual testaments composed by saints was widely practiced.
