= Bertoglio Glacier =

Glacier in Antarctica

Bertoglio Glacier (79°18′S 160°20′E) is a glacier 7 nautical miles (13 km) long, flowing from the Conway Range eastward between Cape Lankester and Hoffman Point to the Ross Ice Shelf. It was mapped by the United States Geological Survey from tellurometer surveys and Navy air photos from 1959 to 1963.

The glacier was named by the Advisory Committee on Antarctic Names for Commander Lloyd W. Bertoglio, U.S. Navy, commander of the 1960 McMurdo Station winter party.
