= Death and funeral of Pope John Paul II =

2005 funeral of head of the Catholic Church

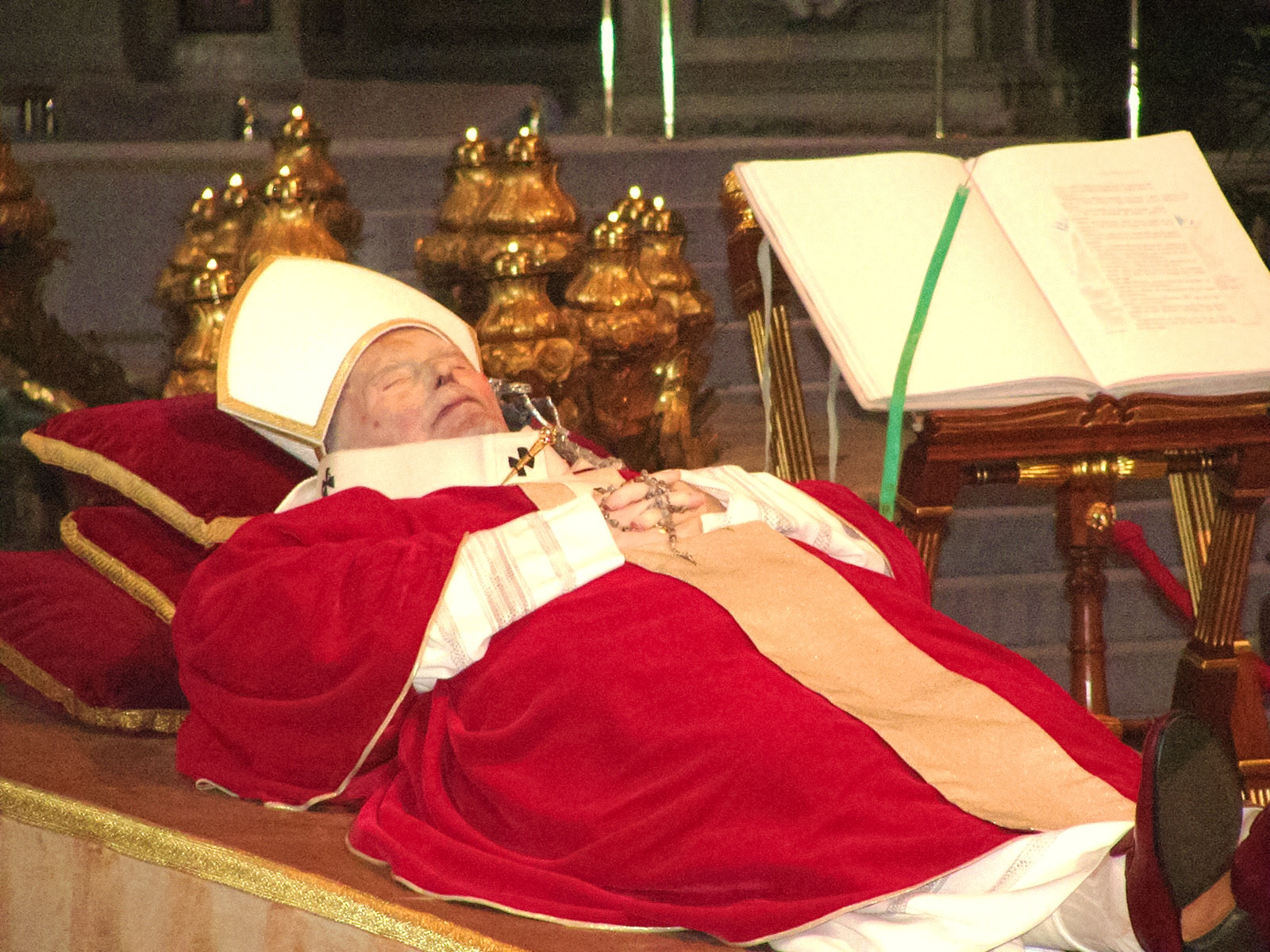
- Body of Pope John Paul II lying in state
- Date: 2 April 2005 (death); 8 April 2005 (funeral and burial)
- Location: Apostolic Palace, Vatican City (death); St. Peter's Basilica, Vatican City (funeral and burial)
- Participants: College of Cardinals (led by then-Cardinal Joseph Ratzinger, later Pope Benedict XVI); Various dignitaries worldwide

On 2 April 2005, at 21:37 CEST (UTC+2), Pope John Paul II died at the age of 84 in his private apartment at the Apostolic Palace in Vatican City. His funeral, held on 8 April, was one of the largest gatherings of Christianity's faithful in history, with approximately four million mourners converging on Rome. The ceremonies followed the revised papal funerary rites that John Paul II himself had established in 1996 through the apostolic constitution Universi Dominici gregis, which governed both the selection of his successor and the rituals surrounding his death and burial.

The funeral rites included a lying in state at St. Peter's Basilica, a Mass of Repose, and a Requiem Mass celebrated by Cardinal Joseph Ratzinger, then Dean of the College of Cardinals. John Paul II's burial was conducted according to his wishes for simplicity, and he was interred beneath St. Peter's Basilica. Dignitaries and religious leaders were present from around the world, including Ecumenical Patriarch Bartholomew I—the first such attendance since the East–West Schism. Many countries declared periods of national mourning, and prayers were offered worldwide for the late pope. The funeral was followed by the novendiales, nine days of official mourning and liturgical observances.

In the subsequent conclave 12 days later, Cardinal Ratzinger was elected as his successor, taking the name Benedict XVI.

== Death ==
On 1 February 2005, the pope was taken to the Gemelli Hospital suffering from acute inflammation and spasm of the larynx, brought on by a bout of influenza. He was released, but in late February 2005 he began having trouble breathing, and he was rushed back. A tracheotomy was performed, allowing him to breathe more easily, but limiting his speaking ability, to which he reacted with evident frustration during a failed attempt at public speaking from the window of the hospital ward.

On Palm Sunday (20 March 2005) the pope made a brief appearance at his window and silently waved an olive branch to pilgrims, which was his last appearance. Two days later there were renewed concerns for his health after reports stated that he had taken a turn for the worse and was not responding to medication. By the end of the month, speculation was growing. The Vatican officials confirmed that he was nearing death when on March 31, 2005, at around 11:00 am, the pope, who had gone to the chapel to celebrate Mass, was beset by strong shivers which was followed by high fever because of a urinary tract infection. Despite the use of antibiotics, the disease progressed and he developed sepsis and multiple organ failure. He was not rushed to the hospital again, however, and equipment for medical monitoring was brought to his residence in the Vatican, where he was followed by a team of top physicians.

On 2 April 2005, Joaquín Navarro-Valls, director of the Holy See Press Office, announced that John Paul II had died that day, at 84 years old, at 21:37 (CEST, UTC+2 ) in his private apartment. He died at 84 years and 319 days of age, 46 days before his 85th birthday. The pope is reported to have died looking towards the window as he prayed, raising his right hand as if he was aware of the crowds present in St. Peter's Square, where he made an effort to say "Amen", before dying. The illumination of a third light in the papal apartment signalled to onlookers that the pope had died. His death was confirmed when an electrocardiogram signal remained flat for more than 20 minutes.

The pope was the third-longest serving pope ever in history, after the first Pope Peter and Pope Pius IX. He died after 26 years and 162 days of papacy. He was buried in the presence of millions on 8 April 2005.

== Rite of papal death ==
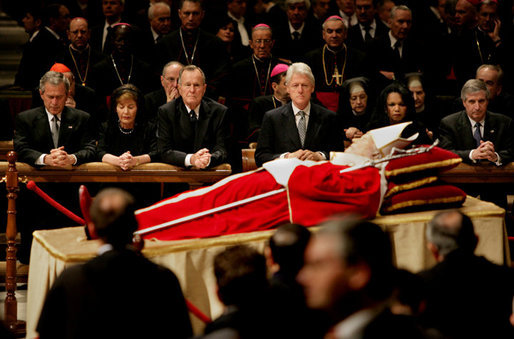
Pope John Paul II's body is laid in St. Peter's Basilica for private visitation by Vatican officials and foreign dignitaries. Among the Americans in the photograph are then US President George W. Bush, his father, former president George H. W. Bush, his wife Laura Bush, former president Bill Clinton, Secretary of State Condoleezza Rice, and Andrew Card.

John Paul II's funeral was the first funeral celebrated according to the Ordo Exsequiarum Romani Pontificis, the liturgical book for papal funerals, which he had approved in 1998. When John Paul II died, the Camerlengo Eduardo Martínez Somalo removed the Pope's Ring of the Fisherman from his finger, then ceremonially crushed it with the ceremonial silver hammer in the presence of members of the College of Cardinals.

While his predecessors had been embalmed after death, the Vatican claimed that Pope John Paul II was not embalmed and lay in state without normal treatment for preservation, which is evident by the grey colour taken on by the body. Also, it was customary for popes to have their organs removed after death. Pope Pius X ended this practice during his reign, and the wish of some Poles that John Paul II's heart be buried in Poland was not obliged.

=== Mass of Repose ===
A first Mass of Repose, such as is offered for anyone baptised in the Catholic Church, commemorating the sending of the soul to God, was led by Cardinal Angelo Sodano, Cardinal Secretary of State, on 3 April 2005, the day after the death of the Pope. That Sunday liturgy coincided with the celebration of the Feast of Divine Mercy, a feast instituted by Pope John Paul II himself. The service was followed by the recitation of the Regina Caeli, at which Archbishop Leonardo Sandri, Substitute of the Secretariat of State read out the words that John Paul II himself wrote for the occasion and was due to recite.

== Rite of Visitation ==
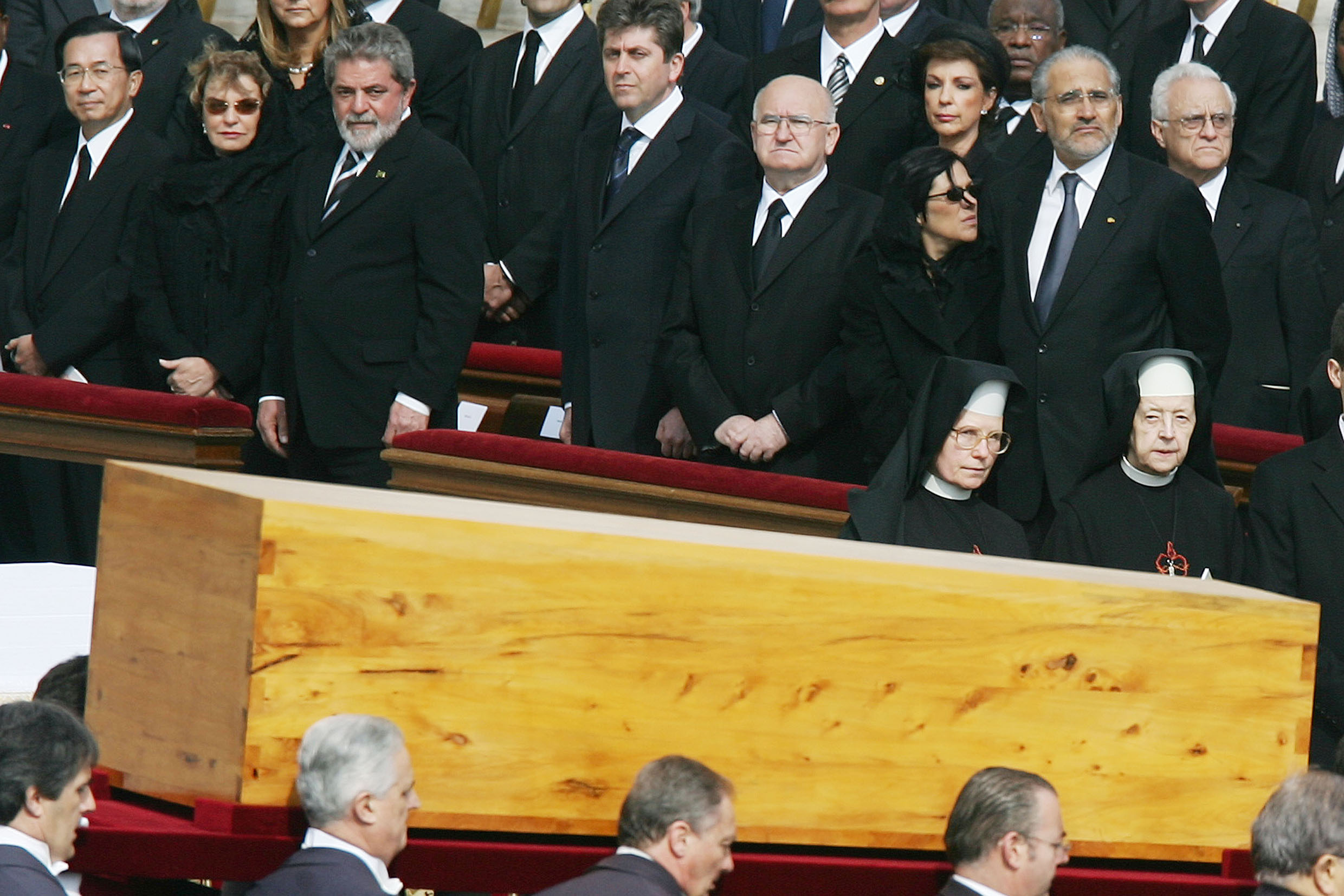
The Papal gentlemen carry the coffin into St. Peter's Square. Standing in the front row are, from left to right, President Chen Shui-bian of Taiwan (represented as China), First Lady Marisa Letícia da Silva and President Luiz Inácio Lula da Silva of Brazil, President Georgi Parvanov of Bulgaria, President Borislav Paravac of Bosnia and Herzegovina, and First Lady Elvira Salinas de Mesa and President Carlos Mesa of Bolivia.

The body of John Paul II was dressed in his vestments and moved to the Clementine Hall on the third level (considered the second floor) of the Apostolic Palace on 3 April.

== Requiem Mass ==
Cardinal Joseph Ratzinger celebrated the Mass of Requiem on 8 April at 10:00 am CEST (08:00 UTC) by virtue of his office as Dean of the College of Cardinals.

=== Processional ===
As the Mass of Requiem began, the doors of St. Peter's Basilica were locked with dignitaries asked to stand outside the church. Only the College of Cardinals and the patriarchs and presiding metropolitans of the Eastern Catholic Churches were allowed inside for a private ceremony in which John Paul was placed in a cypress coffin, the first of three. Before being laid in the coffin, Archbishops Marini and Stanisław Dziwisz had the honour of placing a white silk veil over the face of the pope (a tradition started by Leo XIII). It was his last official act of service to the pope as his papal secretary.

=== Homily ===
After kissing the text of the Book of the Gospels, Cardinal Ratzinger stood before the congregants to offer the homily, which included references to the life and service of Pope John Paul II. He spoke in Italian, first greeting the many political figures and religious leaders that had gathered; and then told the story of how the young Karol had answered the Lord's call and became a priest after the persecution of the Nazis, the answer of the command: "Follow me!" Cardinal Ratzinger also told of John Paul II's life as a bishop, cardinal, and pope, frequently applying scripture to the pope's life. Finally, he told of the pope's devotion to Mary and the Divine Mercy of God. The cardinal's last words were about the end of Pope John Paul II's life: "We entrust your dear soul to the Mother of God, your Mother, who guided you each day and who will guide you now to the eternal glory of her Son, our Lord Jesus Christ".

Some construed the ending of the homily to mean that the pope had already entered into heaven, and had become a saint. With some holding up signs and banners, the people shouted, “Santo subito! Santo subito!” in St. Peter's Square on the death of Pope John Paul II in April 2005. They were calling for “sainthood now.”

=== Rite of Interment ===
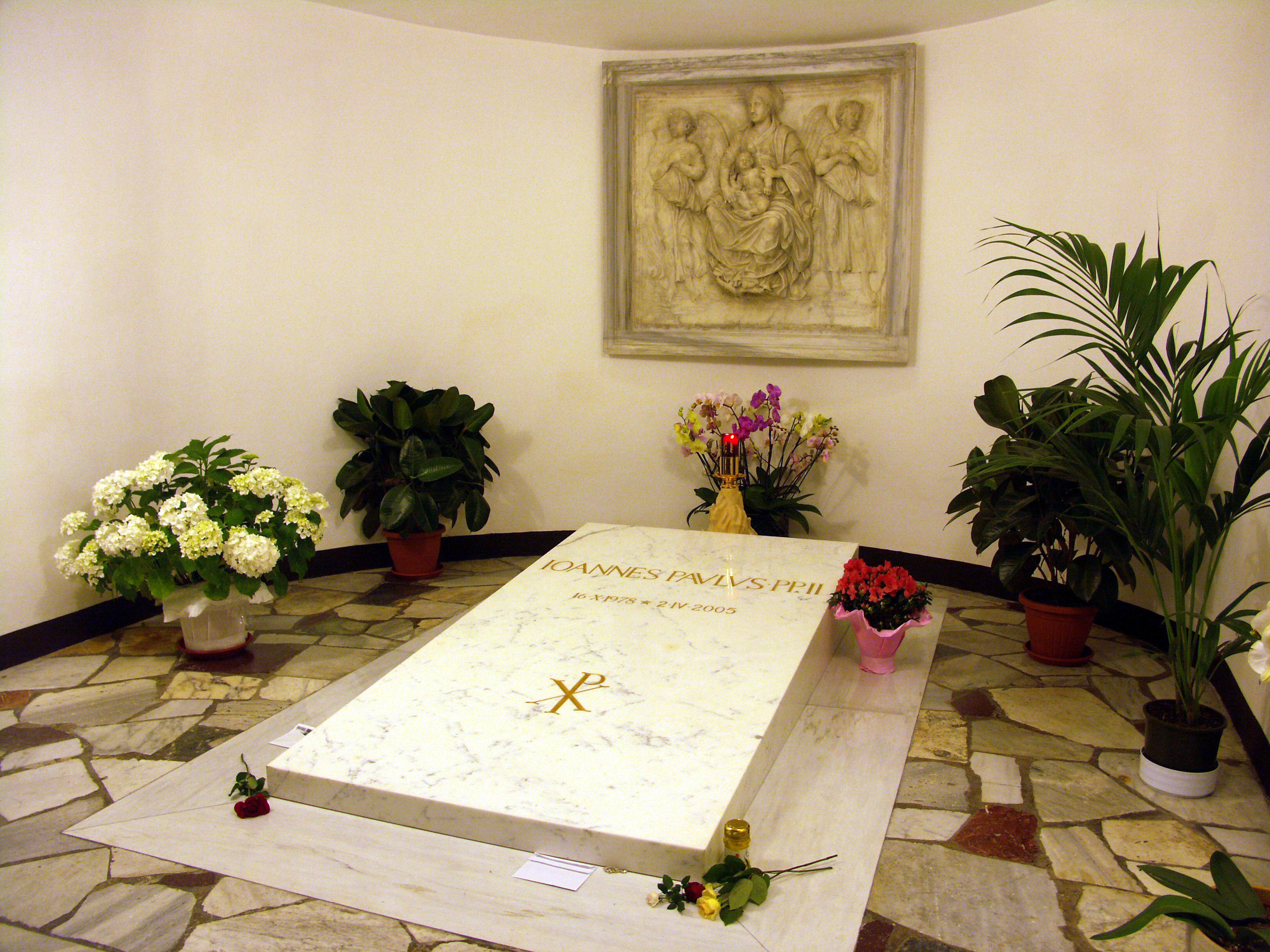
Pope John Paul II was buried in this underground crypt. His remains were removed from this crypt in 2011 in preparation for his beatification.

The people of Poland had wished for the heart of John Paul II to be removed from his body and transferred to Wawel Cathedral to be buried alongside the greatest of Poland's monarchs and National heroes. Cardinal Martínez Somalo said that the request would not be obliged, as per John Paul's wish not to have any parts of his body removed during preparation for the funeral.

Cardinal Martínez Somalo, Camerlengo of the Roman Church, then presided over the Rite of Interment. It was a private service witnessed only by the highest-ranking members of the College of Cardinals. As is custom, Pope John Paul II was entombed in three nested coffins. The cypress coffin was sealed and tied with three red silk ribbons. The unified coffin was lowered into the ground, as the Pope requested, and covered with a plain stone slab featuring his name and dates of his pontificate. Pope John Paul II asked that his burial be like that of Pope Paul VI, not in an elaborate sarcophagus and ornate above-ground tomb, but in "bare earth". His remains lay in this tomb for six years before it was exhumed to prepare for his beatification in 2011.

== Novendiales ==
=== Controversies ===
One of the most controversial honourees was Cardinal Bernard Francis Law, Archpriest of the Basilica di Santa Maria Maggiore, scheduled to preside a novendial on 11 April. During his tenure as Archbishop of Boston, Cardinal Law was accused of having mishandled cases of sexual abuse at the hands of diocesan priests. The event sparked the nationwide Roman Catholic Church sex abuse scandal in the dioceses of the United States.

Several members of the Survivors Network of those Abused by Priests (SNAP) flew to Rome to protest saying Cardinal Law's place of honour was painful to sexual abuse victims and embarrassing to Catholics. Just as the group's members arrived at St. Peter's Basilica, led by founder Barbara Blaine, police officers escorted them outside the confines of St. Peter's Square. Blaine was unable to pass out fliers to people walking into the Mass offered by Cardinal Law.

Blaine had earlier told reporters in a press conference, "We are the sons and daughters of the Catholic family who were raped, sodomized and sexually molested by priests. At this time, we should be able to focus on the Holy Father's death, instead of Cardinal Law's prominence."

== See also ==
- Testament of Pope John Paul II
- Death and funeral of Pope Benedict XVI
- Death and funeral of Pope Francis
- List of largest funerals
