= List of pastoral trips made by Pope Francis =

Pastoral visits of Pope Francis

During his reign, Pope Francis made 34 pastoral visits within Italy and 47 foreign trips, visiting 66 countries in the process. His visit to the Philippines in January 2015 included the largest papal event in history with around 6–7 million attendees in his final Mass at Manila, surpassing the then-largest papal event at World Youth Day 1995 in the same venue twenty years earlier. Although Francis was born and served as priest and bishop of the Archdiocese of Buenos Aires, he never returned to Argentina after he became Pope.

== International visits ==
=== 2013 ===
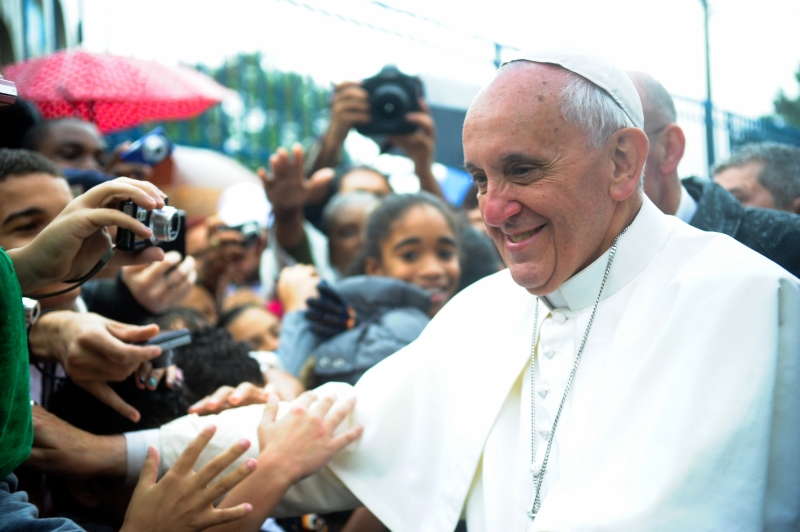
Pope Francis visits a favela in Brazil during the World Youth Day 2013.

- Brazil (22–29 July)

Francis visited Rio de Janeiro, Brazil, for World Youth Day. This was the only scheduled foreign trip for him in the year. Francis was officially welcomed to Brazil during a ceremony at Guanabara Palace and met with Brazilian president Dilma Rousseff. Throughout the celebrations, Francis gathered up to 3.5 million pilgrims to celebrate Mass at Copacabana Beach. During his vigil address, Francis urged the pilgrims not to be "part-time Christians", but to lead full, meaningful lives. The trip was previously scheduled for his predecessor, Benedict XVI, before his retirement.

=== 2014 ===
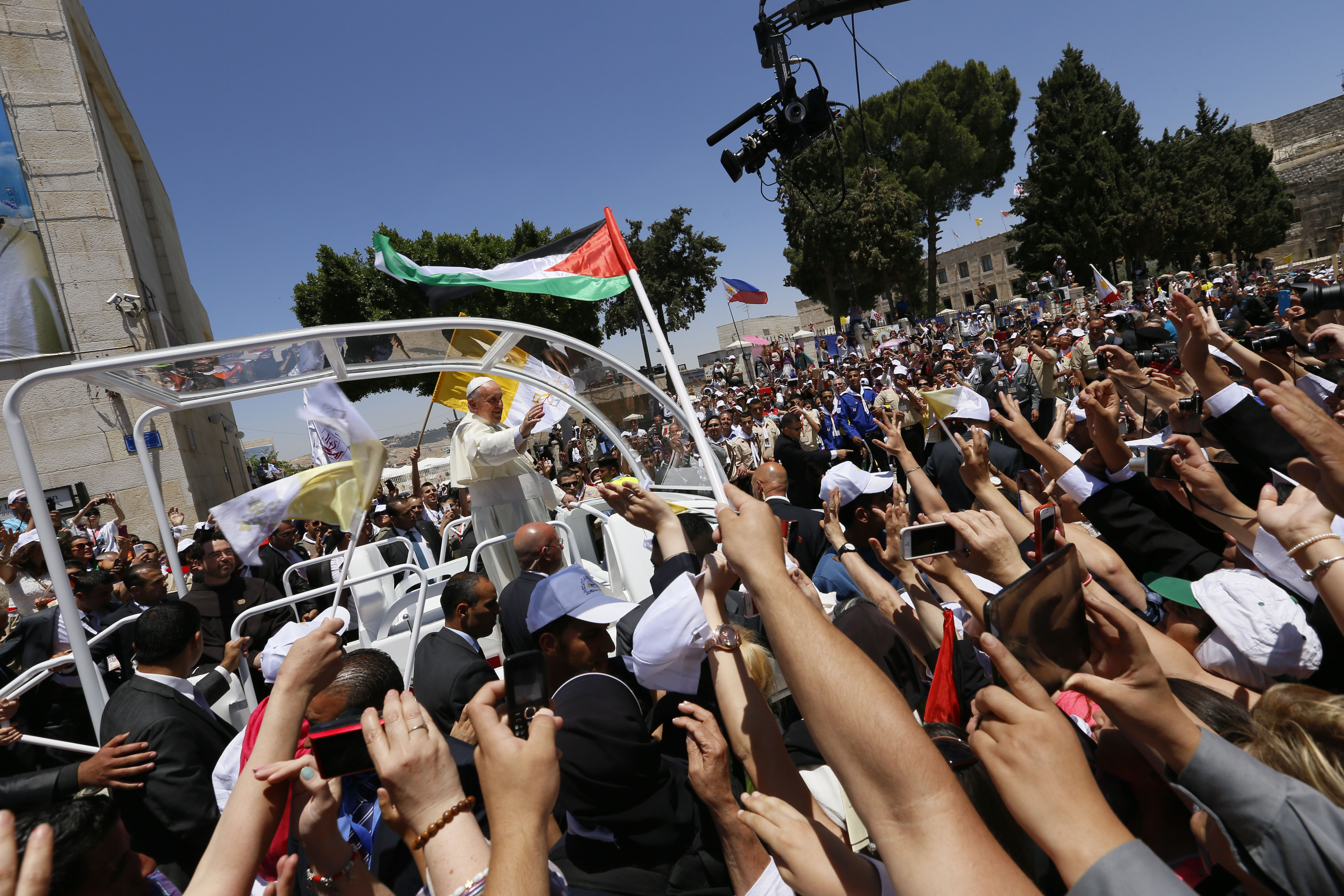
Pope Francis waving to the people after the Mass in Bethlehem (by/ Mustafa Bader)

- Jordan, Israel, and Palestine (24–26 May)

Francis visited Amman, Bethlehem, and Jerusalem during his three-day trip to the region from 24 to 26 May. The trip was announced during the Sunday Angelus on 5 January. Francis arrived in Jordan on 24 May and after meeting with King Abdullah II, celebrated Mass at Amman International Stadium. During his trip, Francis prayed at the Israeli West Bank barrier and also visited the Victims of Acts of Terror Memorial with the Israeli Prime Minister Benjamin Netanyahu. Francis concluded his tour by meeting with Patriarch Bartholomew I to continue inter-faith dialogue with the Eastern Orthodox Church.

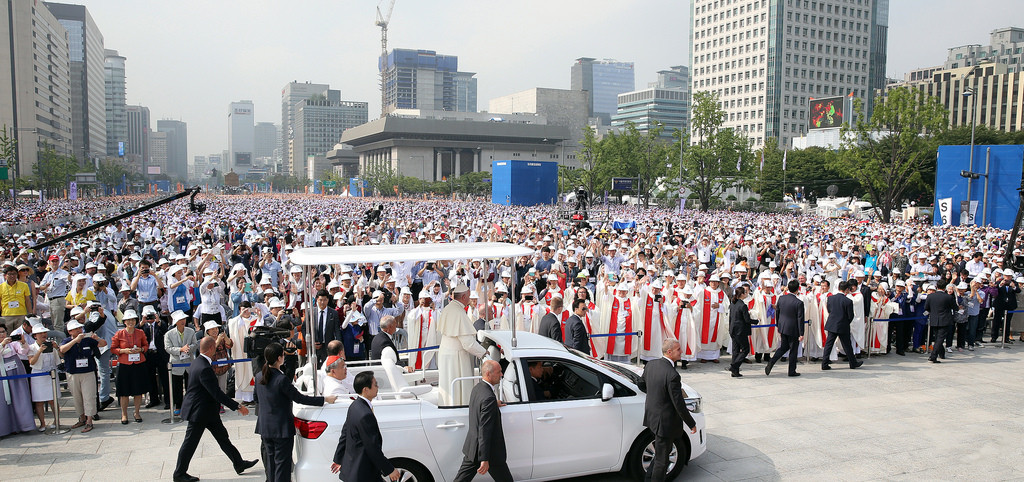
Pope Francis travels through Gwangwhamun Square during the beatification ceremony.

- South Korea (14–18 August)

Pope Francis arrived in Seoul Air Base on 14 August to start his five-day visit to South Korea on the occasion of the Sixth Asian Youth Day. Upon arrival, Francis was greeted by South Korean President Park Geun-hye. Afterwards, Francis held a private meeting with the families of victims of the MV Sewol ferry disaster. He later made a speech in English, his first as Pope. Speaking at the Presidential Office in Seoul he said "I came here thinking of peace and reconciliation on the Korean Peninsula." Francis held the first public Mass of his trip on 15 August in front of a 50,000 strong crowd at Daejeon World Cup Stadium where he asked Koreans to "reject inhumane economic models which create new forms of poverty and marginalize workers." He beatified the first generation of 124 Korean Martyrs in Gwangwhamun Square on front of an estimated crowd of 800,000 people on 16 August. Francis concluded his five-day visit with a Mass for peace and reconciliation of the divided Korean peninsula in Seoul's Myeongdong Cathedral.

- Albania (21 September)

Pope Francis announced in his Angelus address on 15 June that he would make a one-day visit to the city of Tirana in Albania. He said: "With this brief visit, I want to confirm the Church of Albania in the faith, and bear witness to my encouragement and love for a country that has suffered for so long in consequence of the ideologies of the past". Security concerns were raised in the days before the visit after Iraqi governmental officials warned they had received intelligence reports suggesting Islamic fundamentalists may be planning an attempt on the Pope's life while in Albania.

The 11-hour visit was the first European trip made by Francis. He said in August that he had chosen Albania as the first destination because it has set a model for harmony between the various religions by establishing a national unity government that includes Muslims, Orthodox, and Catholic Christians. During his stay, he met Albanian President Bujar Nishani, celebrated Mass in Mother Teresa square in Tirana, and met with religious leaders, including those of the Muslim, Orthodox, Bektashi, Jewish and Protestant faiths. He also honored those persecuted under the rule of former communist dictator Enver Hoxha. Some 130 Christian clergy died in detention or were executed during the 1944–1985 dictatorship of Hoxha, who declared Albania the world's first atheist state in 1967. Pictures of some of the priests persecuted or executed during the period were hung in Tirana's main Martyrs of the Nation boulevard ahead of the pope's visit. Albania has since seen a revival of Catholicism partly owing to the popularity of Mother Teresa, who had Albanian origins despite being born in what is now Macedonia.

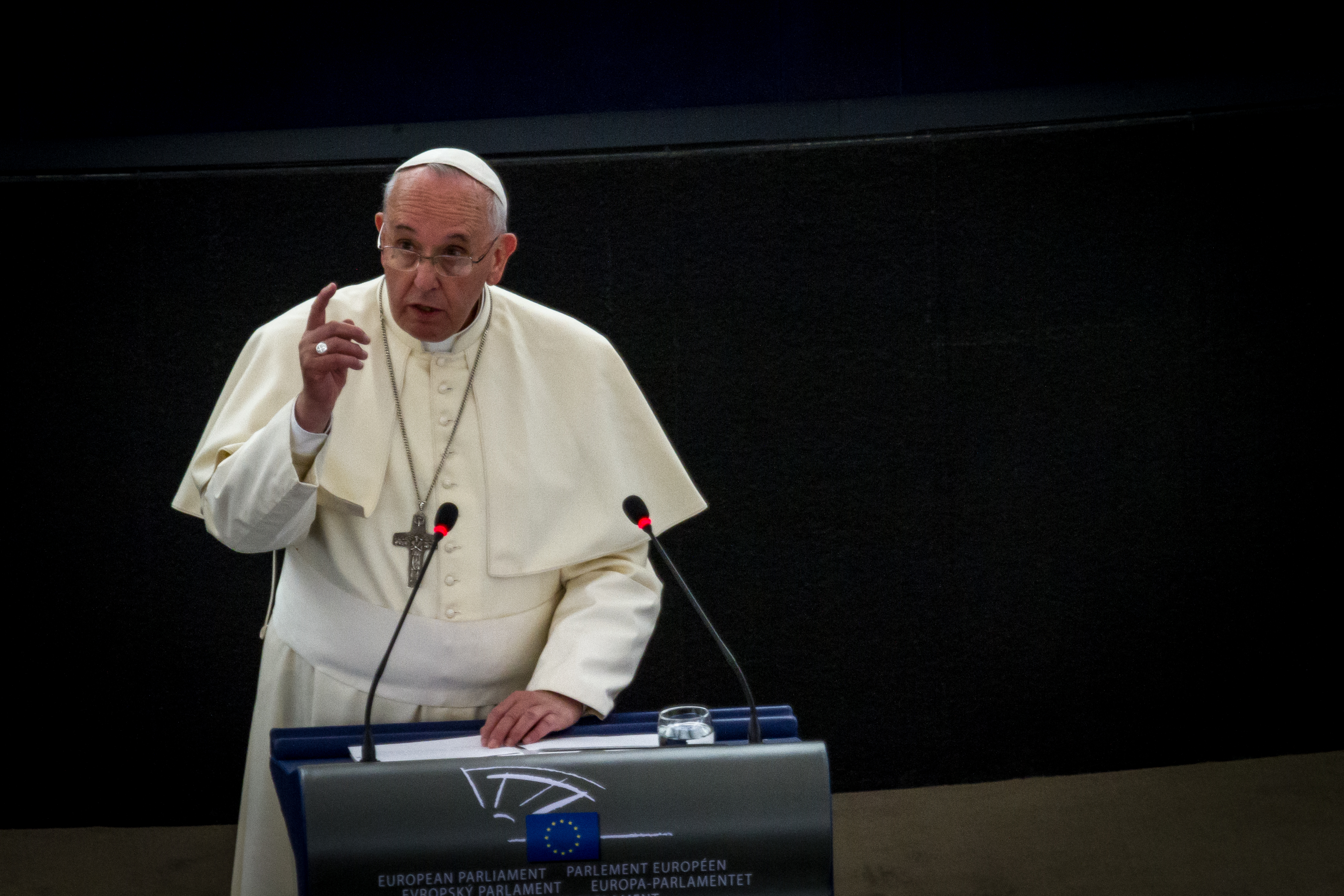
Francis making his address to the European Parliament

- France (25 November)

Pope Francis made a four-hour visit, the shortest made by any pope abroad, to Strasbourg on 25 November 2014, where he addressed the European Parliament and the Council of Europe raising issues such as the dignified treatment of immigrants arriving illegally in Europe and better conditions for workers.

- Turkey (28–30 November)

Pope Francis accepted an invitation to visit Turkey at the behest of president Recep Tayyip Erdoğan in September 2014. This invitation also came from Patriarch Bartholomew I in order to commemorate the feast day of Saint Andrew. Francis arrived at Esenboğa International Airport in Ankara on 28 November where he was met by Turkish dignitaries before he traveled to Anıtkabir, laying a wreath in memory of the Turkish Republic's founder, Mustafa Kemal Atatürk. Francis then traveled to the Presidential Palace where he met with President Erdoğan and gave a speech urging interfaith dialogue to counter fanaticism and fundamentalism and called for a renewed Middle-East peace push, saying the region had "for too long been a theatre of fratricidal wars". The following day, Francis visited the Blue Mosque in Istanbul where he prayed silently alongside senior Islamic clerics. Francis concluded his visit with a liturgy in the Church of St. George alongside Bartholomew I, asking for his blessing "for me and the Church of Rome" and also urging the re-unification between the two Churches, telling the Orthodox faithful gathered in St George's that "I want to assure each one of you gathered here that, to reach the desired goal of full unity, the Catholic Church does not intend to impose any conditions except that of the shared profession of faith".

=== 2015 ===
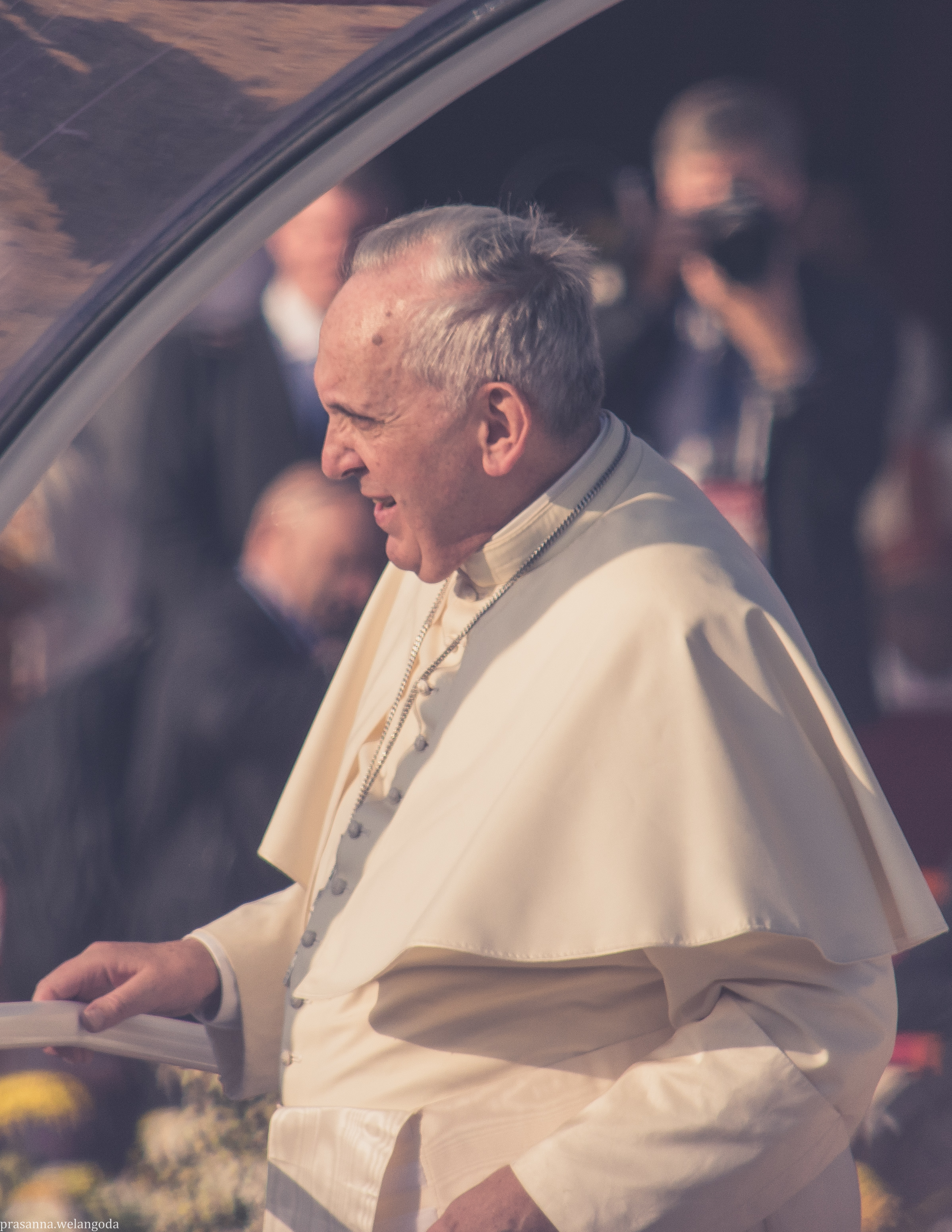
Pope Francis in Colombo, Sri Lanka, 14 January 2015

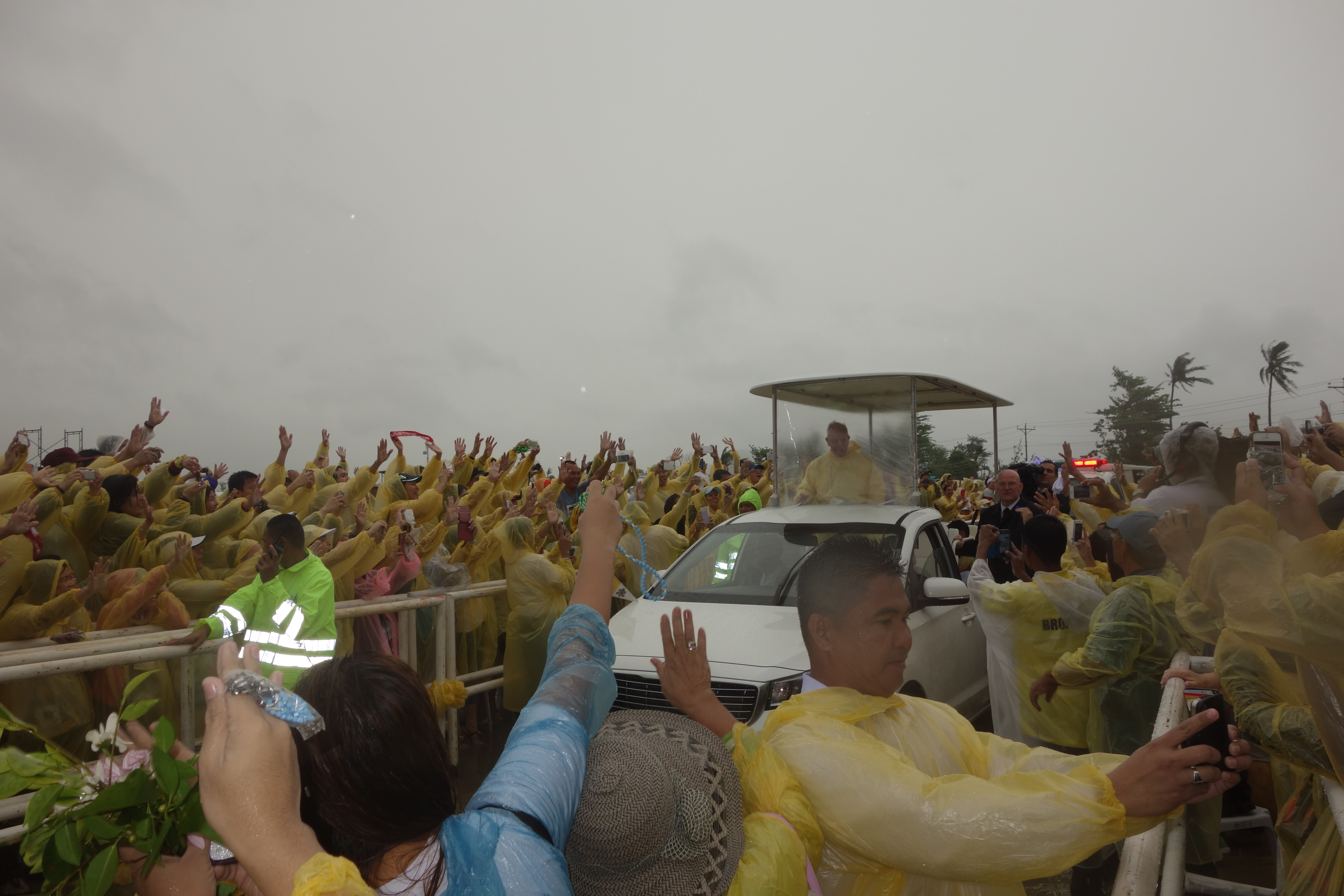
Pope Francis rides around the faithful after the open air Mass in Tacloban. 17 January 2015.

- Sri Lanka and Philippines (13–19 January)

Pope Francis visited Sri Lanka on 13–15 January and the Philippines (15–19) in January.

In Sri Lanka he paid pastoral visits to Shrine of Our Lady of Madhu in Madhu and Basilica of Our Lady of Lanka.

Pope Francis's visit to Philippines was the fourth papal visit to the island nation. Paul VI visited Philippines in 1970 and John Paul II came in 1981 for the beatifications of Lorenzo Ruiz and then Domingo Ibáñez de Erquicia and returned in 1995 for the celebration of the World Youth Day.

Pope Francis's visit to the Philippines in January 2015 had become the largest papal event in history with around 6–7 million attended his final Mass at Manila surpassing the then largest papal event at World Youth Day 1995 in the same venue 20 years earlier.

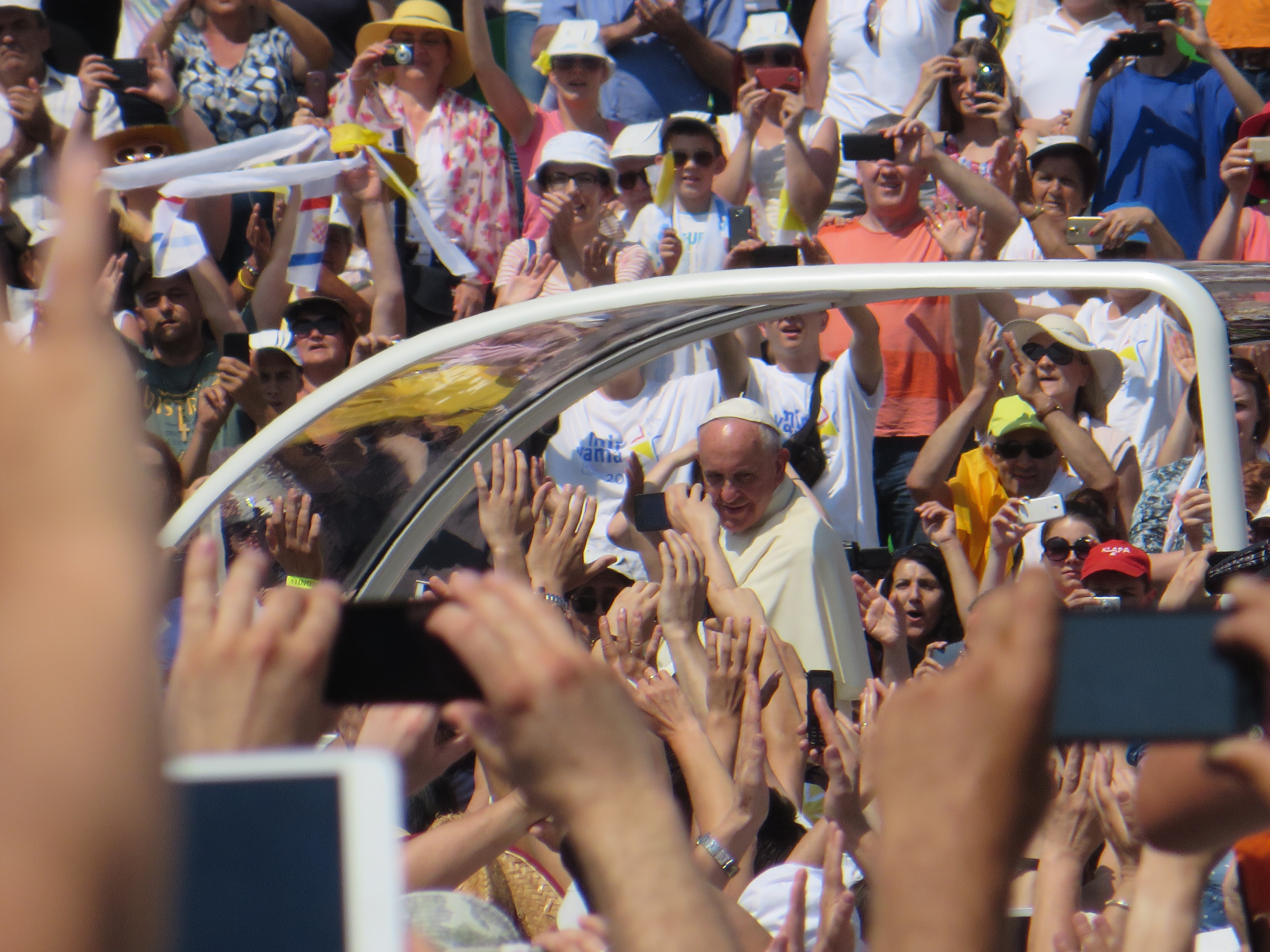
Pope Francis arriving at Koševo Stadium in Sarajevo

- Bosnia and Herzegovina (6 June)

Pope Francis announced on 1 February 2015 that he intended to visit Sarajevo, the capital of Bosnia and Herzegovina, on 6 June 2015. His visit placed importance on ecumenical dialogue. It is estimated that 67,000 people visited the event whose peak was the Mass at the Koševo Stadium. Most pilgrims were from Croatia and Bosnia and Herzegovina, but there were also 1,000 pilgrims from Serbia, many groups from Hungary, Slovenia, Macedonia, communities of Croats from Germany, Austria, United States, and group of nuns from Panama and even Egypt.

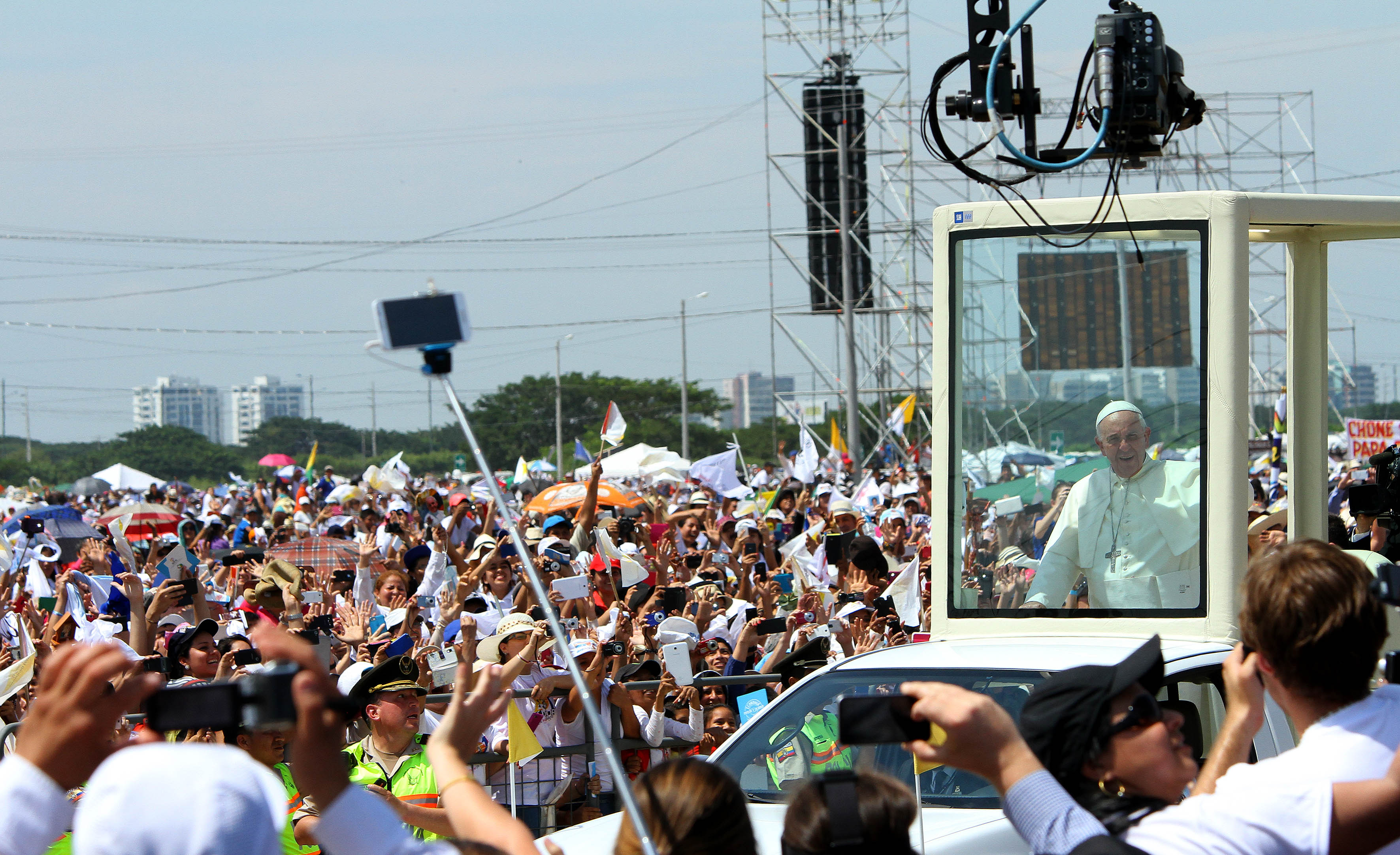
Pope Francis in Paraguay

- Ecuador, Bolivia, and Paraguay (5 July – 13 July)

The Holy See announced in May 2015 that Pope Francis would visit Bolivia in July 2015, as well as Ecuador and Paraguay. Before the visit, Bolivian President Evo Morales had confirmed that Pope Francis would meet with indigenous organizations on the sidelines of official functions. The pope was scheduled to be in Ecuador from 5–8 July, Bolivia from 8–10 July and Paraguay from 10–12 July 2015. His return to Rome was scheduled for 13 July 2015. The Holy See Press Office's Director, Federico Lombardi, S.J., acknowledged there were reports that Pope Francis might chew coca leaves, or perhaps drink tea made from coca. (He ended up drinking coca tea with a couple other ingredients.) In that region, coca is considered sacred by some and is a key crop. It is rich in calcium, protein, and iron, among other nutrients, and could potentially fight altitude sickness. This is a popular reason for its use, but it is also the main ingredient in cocaine. Pope John Paul II and Pope Paul VI both had similar experiences, so engaging in this particular cultural custom would not be unprecedented.

In the course of his visit to Ecuador, Pope Francis met President Rafael Correa, visited with priests and seminarians, paid a private visit to a Jesuit priest friend, visited a home for the elderly in Quito and a shrine in the town of El Quinche. His last Mass in Ecuador drew about 1.5 million people.

Arriving in Bolivia on 8 July, Pope Francis was received by President Evo Morales at El Alto International Airport near La Paz. Francis spoke, in part: "Bolivia is making important steps towards including broad sectors in the country's economic, social and political life." Later, during their meeting, Morales awarded Pope Francis with the highest Bolivian decoration, the Grand Cross of the Order of the Condor of the Andes and State decoration of Luís Espinal Camps, named after a Jesuit priest and activist known for his commitment to the disadvantaged people of the country, who was murdered by paramilitary forces in March 1980. He also presented the pope with a crucifix in form of a hammer and sickle, which form the symbol of the Communist Party, which he explained had been a form created by Espinal; the gift immediately proved controversial. The Pope also prayed in the place near La Paz where the body of this murdered Jesuit priest was found, and he highlighted his preaching of the Gospel. Pope Francis visited also the Cathedral of La Paz, and after leaving, he traveled to Santa Cruz de la Sierra in the eastern part of Bolivia. On 9 July Pope Francis celebrated Mass in Santa Cruz de la Sierra connected with the opening of the Fifth National Eucharistic Congress. He also attended the World Meeting of Popular Movements, in Santa Cruz de la Sierra, where he addressed Bolivia's poor and indigenous communities, and apologized to the country's indigenous people for the "grave sins" the church committed towards them during Spanish colonial rule. This event brought together delegates from popular movements from around the world; Morales also attended. Francis expressed in his speech on this event his solidarity with gathered popular movements and their efforts.

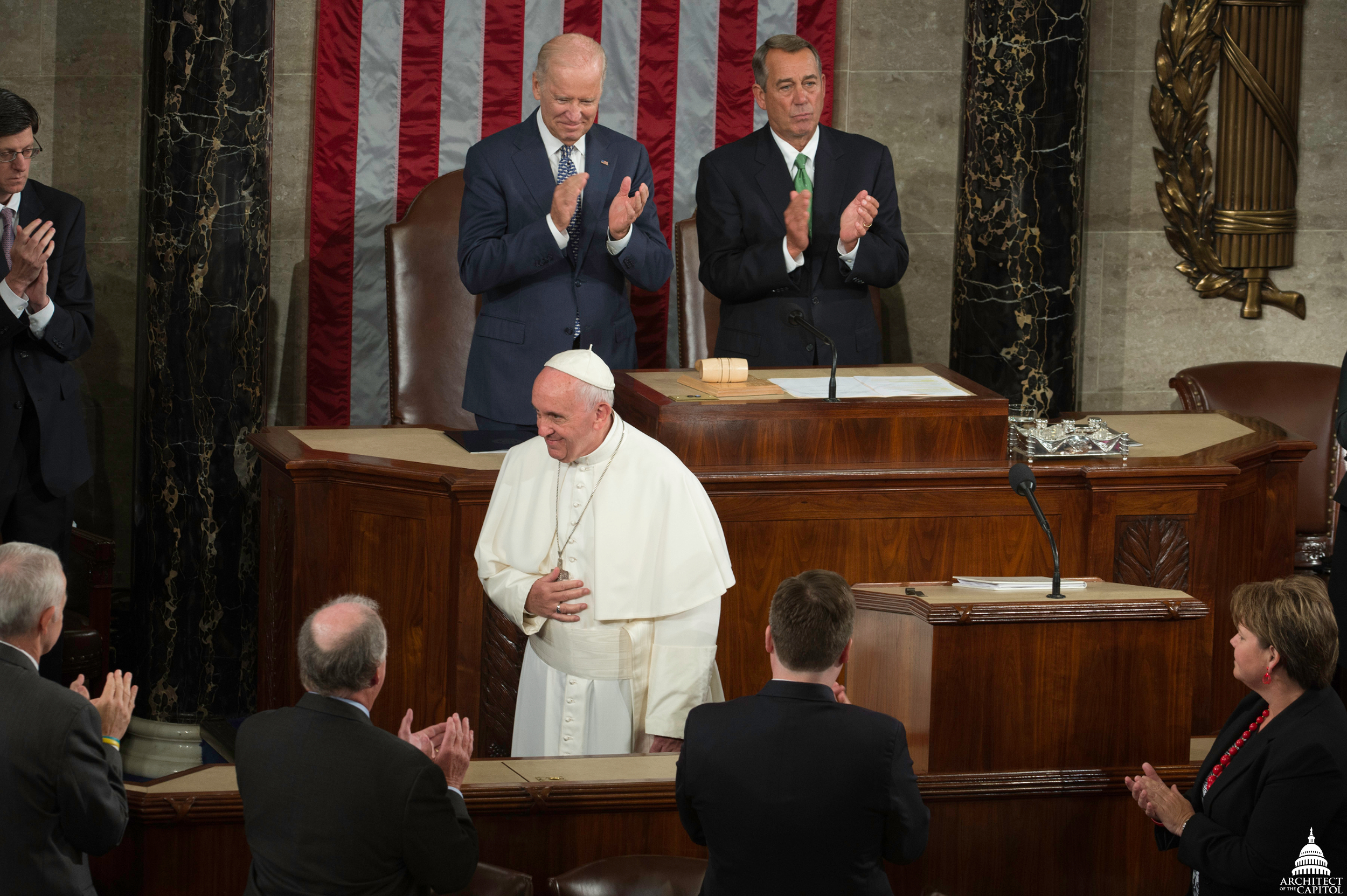
Pope Francis addresses the U.S. Congress.

- Cuba and United States (19–27 September)

On 19 September 2015 Pope Francis departed aboard an Alitalia Airbus A330 (Shepherd One) from Rome's Fiumicino International Airport, to Havana's José Martí International Airport where he arrived to an official Welcoming Ceremony. The next day, he was the principal celebrant at a Papal Mass at the Plaza de la Revolución in Havana at 9:00, before he paid a courtesy visit to the President of the Council of State and of the Council of Ministers of the Republic at Palacio de la Revolución in Havana. His day ended with celebrations of Vespers with priests, men and women religious, and seminarians, at the Cathedral of Havana, and a greeting to the young people of the "Centro Cultural Padre Félix Varela" in Havana during the early evening.

On 21 September, he departed by plane from Havana for Holguín, to preside at a Papal Mass at Plaza de la Revolución. Before departing for Santiago de Cuba, he gave a blessing to the city, from Loma de la Cruz, in Holguín. Having arrived in Santiago, he met with the Bishops of Cuba at St Basil the Great Seminary, and say a prayer to the Virgen de la Caridad, with the Bishops and the Papal Entourage, at the Minor Basilica of the Shrine "Virgen de la Caridad del Cobre" in Santiago.

On 22 September, he celebrated a Papal Mass at the Minor Basilica of the Shrine "Virgen de la Caridad del Cobre" in Santiago in the morning and later had a meeting with families at Our Lady of the Assumption Cathedral in Santiago. After a blessing of the city of Santiago from the square in front of the Cathedral of Santiago, he left with a farewell ceremony from Santiago Airport, en route to Washington, D.C., where he arrived at Joint Base Andrews during the evening of 22 September 2015.

On Wednesday, 23 September, the pope met with President Barack Obama at the White House. It was the third visit by a pope to the White House, following meetings between Jimmy Carter and Pope John Paul II in October 1979 and George W. Bush and Pope Benedict XVI in April 2008.

Also that day, Francis took part in a prayer with bishops from the United States at the Cathedral of St. Matthew the Apostle, the seat of Cardinal Donald Wuerl, the archbishop of Washington. Later that day, he celebrated Mass at the Basilica of the National Shrine of the Immaculate Conception, near the Catholic University of America. During the Mass, he canonized (declared to be a Saint) Junípero Serra, a Spanish Franciscan friar who founded a mission in Baja California, and the first nine of 21 Spanish missions in California.

On Thursday, 24 September, Pope Francis gave an address to a Joint session of the United States Congress, the first Supreme Pontiff to do so. He followed that with a visit to St. Patrick's Church, the oldest parish church in Washington. The church was founded in 1794. He also visited the Washington, D.C. local Catholic Charities office. He then flew from Washington, to New York City. After arriving at New York City's John F. Kennedy International Airport, he took part with New York's Cardinal Timothy Dolan in Evening Vespers (part of the Liturgy of the Hours), at St. Patrick's Cathedral.

On Friday, 25 September, Pope Francis addressed the United Nations General Assembly. It was the fifth address by a Pope to the U.N. General Assembly, following appearances by Pope Paul VI in October 1965, Pope John Paul II in October 1979 and October 1995, and Pope Benedict XVI in April 2008. Following the address to the U.N., he participated in an ecumenical service at the National September 11 Memorial & Museum, at the former World Trade Center site. In the afternoon, he visited a school in East Harlem, then celebrated a Papal Mass at Madison Square Garden.

On Saturday, 26 September, Pope Francis traveled from New York to Philadelphia, where he was welcomed by city and state leaders and Philadelphia's Archbishop Charles J. Chaput, O.F.M. Cap. He celebrated a Papal Mass at the Cathedral Basilica of Saints Peter and Paul. He visited Independence Mall in the afternoon, and the Festival of Families of the 2015 World Meeting of Families in the early evening. The Pope's visit concluded on Sunday, 27 September, with a Papal Mass in the afternoon. After a departure ceremony, he departed on a jet for Rome and the Vatican from Philadelphia International Airport.

In honor of the visit, the Museum of the Bible will sponsor a special exhibition entitled "Verbum Domini II" at the Philadelphia Convention Center, adjacent to the World Meeting. The official schedule of his visit was announced at the end of June.

- Kenya, Uganda, and Central African Republic (25–30 November)

Pope Francis stated, aboard the papal plane returning from the Philippines, that he hoped to visit Africa late in 2015 and mentioned the Central African Republic and Uganda as likely sites. The Holy See Press Office confirmed in June 2015 that the pope would visit those two countries. The Holy See confirmed in September that Francis's last trip for 2015 would in fact consist of Kenya, Uganda, and the Central African Republic. The visit started with Nairobi, Kenya (25–27 November), then arrive in Entebbe, Uganda with visits to Namugongo and Kampala (27–29 November), and will finally end the visit in Bangui, Central African Republic (29–30 November) where he spent 39 hours before flying back to Rome. Pope Francis's visit to the Central African Republic, which is in a state of a civil war, made him the first pope to enter an active war zone.

On Wednesday, 25 November, Pope Francis arrived at the Jomo Kenyatta International Airport in Nairobi aboard an Alitalia Airbus A330 ("Shepherd One") at approximately 4:32 pm EAT, about 30 minutes ahead of schedule, where he was welcomed by members of the Government of Kenya, led by President Uhuru Kenyatta and First Lady Margaret Gakuo Kenyatta, and a number of Catholic bishops, led by Cardinal John Njue, Archbishop of Nairobi. A band of traditional dancers also performed while the pope arrived. Pope Francis and his entourage then headed to the State House, where he was honored with a 21-gun salute and a guard of honour from the Kenya Army, before holding private talks with President Kenyatta and other government officials. There, he also met with former presidents Daniel arap Moi and Mwai Kibaki, as well as the Kenyatta family. After the meetings, President Kenyatta and Pope Francis each addressed the nation from the lawn of the State House. During his 11-minute speech, the pope touched on the importance of the youth and the environment, addressing poverty and inequality, reconciliation, and peace. After, Pope Francis boarded his popemobile and headed to the Apostolic Nunciature in Westlands, Nairobi, his residence during his visit in Kenya.

The following day, Thursday, 26 November, Pope Francis participated in an interfaith dialogue with local faith leaders at the Apostolic Nunciature, where he apprised the importance of interfaith dialogues as "essential" for preventing radicalization and religious attacks, mentioning the Westgate shopping mall attack in September 2013 and the Garissa University College attack in April 2015 to which the jihadist group Al-Shabaab claimed responsibility for. Later that morning, Pope Francis headed to the University of Nairobi campus, where he celebrated his first papal Mass in Africa with an estimated crowd of 1.4 million people. In his homily, the pope urged Kenyans to support families and inclusive societies and "resist practices which foster arrogance in men, hurt or demean women and threaten the life of the innocent unborn." In the afternoon, Pope Francis met with Kenyan priests, seminarians, and devotees at the field of St. Mary's School. In his speech addressing them, the pope stressed the importance of consecrated life that is only achieved by "staying true to the calling" and their commitment to service. He also urged the priests, seminarians, and devotees to continue the act of prayer and to avoid "the sin of indifference and lukewarmness," saying that "indifference makes God vomit." After his speech, Pope Francis headed to the United Nations Office at Nairobi, where he delivered a speech addressing the staff on climate change ahead of the 2015 United Nations Climate Change Conference in Paris, saying that "it would be 'catastrophic' if particular interests prevailed over the common good of people and the planet or if the conference were manipulated by business interests" and urging world leaders at the conference to reach an agreement over the limitations of carbon footprint and environmental degradation. He also warned Africans on the effects of ivory trade and conflict resource to Africa's natural environment, linking the illegal trafficking activities to organized crime and terrorism.

On Friday, 27 November, Pope Francis visited the residents of the Kangemi slum, where he presided over a Mass celebrated by the residents at their local church. The pope criticized the "new colonialism" of injustice and "urban exclusion" faced by the Kenyan slums, including the lack of infrastructure and basic services such as education, electricity, sewage treatments, drinking water, and healthcare, as well as inadequate housing and the treatment of children to criminal gangs. Later that morning, Pope Francis met with the Kenyan youth at the Moi International Sports Centre in Kasarani, where he answered some of the youth's testimonies regarding issues faced by the Kenyan youth, including corruption, issues on tribalism, religious fanaticism, and radicalization. He urged the Kenyan youth to avoid the temptation of corruption, saying: "Corruption is something that gets inside of us, it's like sugar. But it ends badly. When we have too much sugar, we end up with diabetes, or our country ends up being diabetic." He also discussed with the Kenyan youth the importance of education and jobs to prevent radicalization and the recruitment of the youth to join militant groups. In the afternoon, Pope Francis headed to the Jomo Kenyatta International Airport to depart Nairobi for Uganda. The pope was sent off by President Kenyatta, First Lady Margaret, Deputy President William Ruto, Senate Speaker Ekwee Ethuro, several other Kenyan government officials, and a number of Catholic leaders. Traditional dancers and the Kenya Defence Forces band performed as the pope departed. Pope Francis and his delegation departed Nairobi at approximately 3:51 pm EAT aboard an Alitalia A330 ("Shepherd One"). He arrived at the Entebbe International Airport an hour later, where a military band played the national anthems for Vatican City and Uganda, and traditional drummers and dancers were performing while he was welcomed by President Yoweri Museveni, First Lady Janet Museveni, and a number of Catholic bishops. He then headed to the State House for a brief meeting with President Museveni and South Sudanese president Salva Kiir.

On Saturday, 28 November, Pope Francis headed to Namugongo to visit the Munyonyo Martyrs Shrine dedicated to the Uganda Martyrs, a group of 45 Christian converts in Buganda who were burned to death in the late 19th century for refusing to renounce their faith under Kabaka Mwanga II. President Museveni initially invited the pope to visit Uganda in October 2014, the 50th year anniversary of the canonization of the Uganda Martyrs, but declined due to prior commitments. He then celebrated Mass with an estimated crowd of 1.5 to 2 million people to honor the martyrs. Among the attendees were President Museveni, President Kiir of South Sudan, and Rwandan President Paul Kagame, as well as descendants of Kabaka Mwanga II. During the celebrations, Pope Francis urged the audience to follow the zeal of the Uganda Martyrs in their mission by "taking care of the elderly, the poor, the widowed and the abandoned." In the afternoon, Pope Francis headed to the unused Kampala Airport for a meeting with around 150,000 of the Ugandan youth, where two youths delivered testimonies to the pope regarding the challenges faced by the Ugandan youth, particularly the tribulations of conflict and the spread of HIV to the youth. He later visited the House of Charity in Nalukolongo, a home for the poor, sick, and disabled, to meet with them.

=== 2016 ===
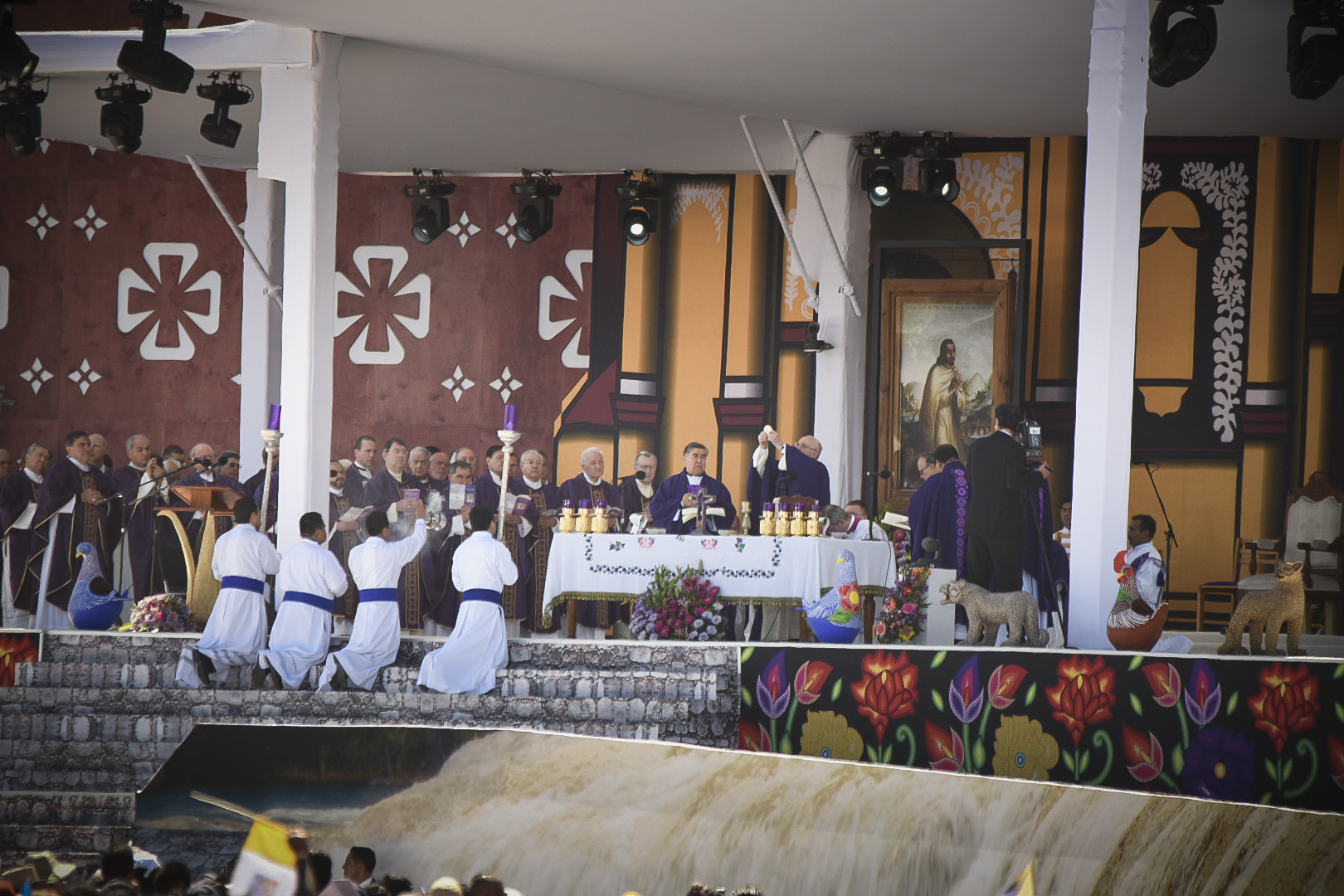
Pope Francis celebrates a Mass at San Cristóbal de las Casas in Mexico.

- Cuba and Mexico (12–18 February)

Pope Francis, on 7 June 2014, accepted an invitation to visit Mexico at the behest of the Mexican president Enrique Peña Nieto. In October 2015 it was confirmed by the Holy See spokesman that the pope would travel to Mexico in early 2016. It was also confirmed that Pope Francis would visit the Basilica of Our Lady of Guadalupe in Mexico City. On 1 November 2015, Cardinal Norberto Rivera Carrera, Archbishop of Mexico City, confirmed the pope's visit and said the pope would arrive on 12 February 2016. It was confirmed that, besides Mexico City, Pope Francis would also visit the cities of Ecatepec, Tuxtla Gutiérrez, San Cristobal de las Casas, Morelia and Ciudad Juárez.

On 12 February 2016, Pope Francis, and Patriarch Kirill, of the Russian Orthodox Church, met at José Martí International Airport near Havana, Cuba, and signed a thirty-point joint declaration (Joint Declaration of Pope Francis and Patriarch Kirill), prepared in advance, addressing global issues including their hope for re–establishment of full unity. The meeting was facilitated by the Cuban leadership who proposed Cuba as a neutral place for the two religious leaders to meet.

- Greece (16 April)

On 5 April 2016 sources reported Pope Francis would visit the Greek island of Lesbos in support of the thousands of refugees who are there awaiting asylum, or who have passed through the island on their way to Europe and beyond. The pope reported that such a visit was under consideration. The Holy See announced that the pope would make a one-day visit to the island on 16 April 2016.

- Armenia (24–26 June)

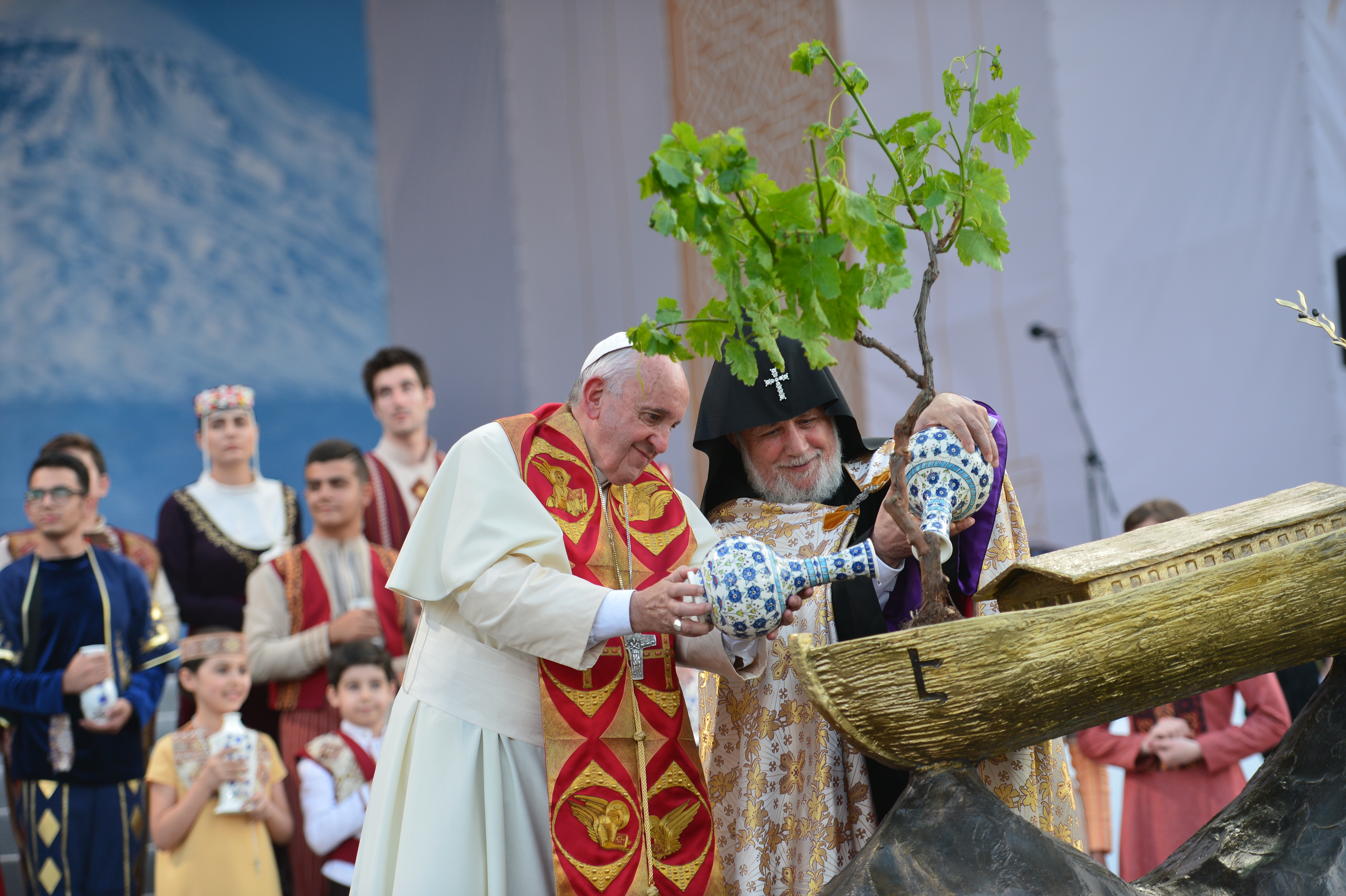
Pope Francis and Catholicos Garegin II at an ecumenic ceremony in the Republic Square, Yerevan, Armenia, June 2016

President Serzh Sargsyan of Armenia extended an open official invitation to Pope Francis to visit Armenia in 2015, which the pontiff readily accepted, expressing his sincere desire to visit the country. It was confirmed in 2015 that the pope would visit Armenia sometime in 2016. An April visit was thought possible, but in February 2016, there was possibility that it could be forwarded till September. In March 2016, the Holy See made it clear that any visit to Armenia was under consideration and may be in the latter half of June. The Holy See announced in a press bulletin of 9 April 2016 that the pope formally accepted an invitation to visit Armenia, from June 24 to June 26.

During the historic three-day visit under his "Visit to the First Christian Nation" pilgrimage, Francis honored the victims of the Armenian genocide at the Tsitsernakaberd memorial and joined prayers in the Etchmiadzin Cathedral. He explicitly referred to the 1915 slaughter of Armenians as "the first genocide of the 20th century". He signed a joint declaration with Catholicos Garegin II of the Armenian Apostolic Church, citing a strengthening of ties between Armenian Apostolic and Catholic churches.

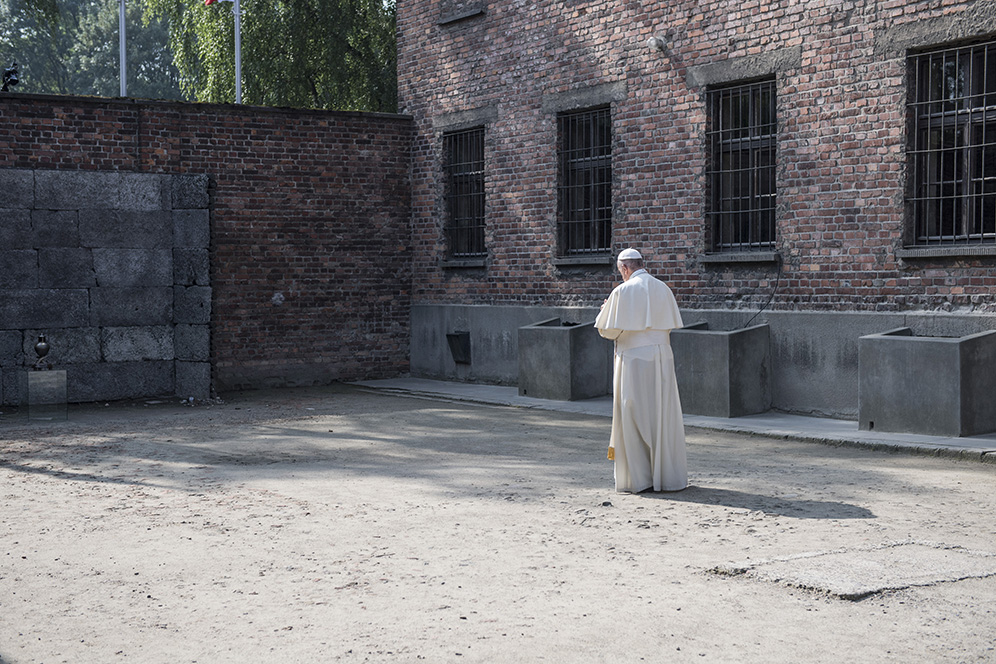
Pope Francis in silent prayer at Auschwitz

- Poland (27–31 July)

Pope Francis visited Kraków, Poland, the city where Karol Wojtyła had served as the archbishop, from 27–31 July 2016 celebrating World Youth Day 2016. Wojtyła was later elected Pope John Paul II, and canonised by Francis after his death. The pope took the opportunity to visit the Auschwitz concentration camp where he spent time in silent prayer and visited the cell of Saint Maximilian Kolbe. Afterwards, he met with several Holocaust survivors before leaving the camp.

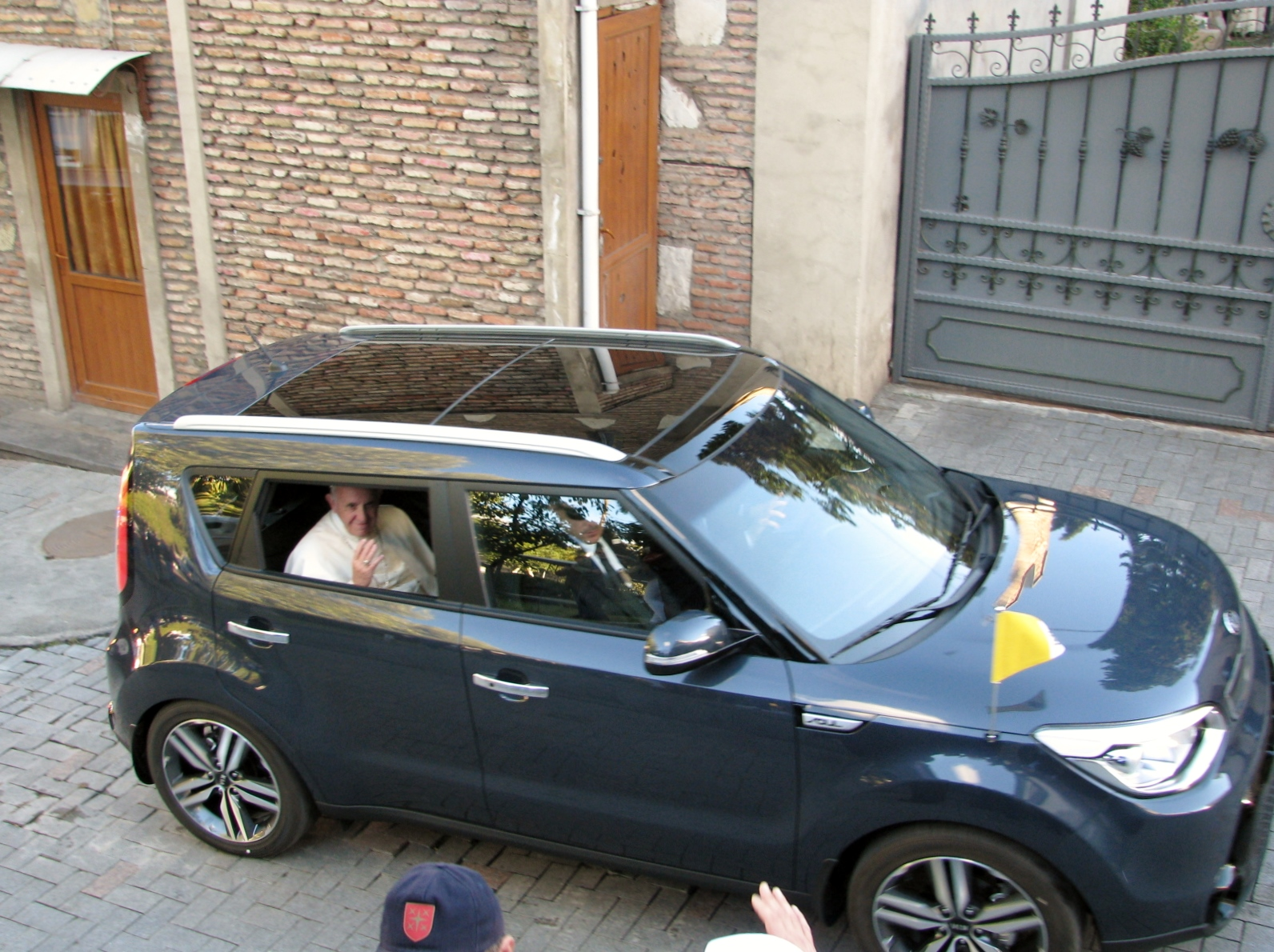
Pope Francis in Georgia, arriving to the Patriarchy of the Georgian Orthodox Church

- Georgia and Azerbaijan (30 September – 2 October)

It was reported in early 2016 that a potential visit to Georgia and Azerbaijan could take place in September 2016 alongside a possible trip to Armenia. It was later reported that it was still in the initial planning phases and that nothing was set concretely. The Holy See announced in a press bulletin of 9 April 2016 that the pope would visit those countries from 30 September to 2 October after receiving formal invitations from the civic authorities and Ilia II of Georgia. The pontiff's journey began on Friday in Georgia, where he was met at the airport by Patriarch Ilia II, the head of the Georgian Orthodox Church. While in Georgia, Pope Francis reached out to the Georgian church, despite an apparent snub by Orthodox leaders who declined to attend a Mass he held Saturday in a largely empty stadium in the Georgian capital, Tbilisi, after they also discouraged followers from attending. The apparent courtship extended to comments on marriage in which he embraced ideas held dear by the Georgian Orthodox Church. Without addressing homosexuality directly, he criticized "ideological colonization"—shorthand for the influence of foreign ideas on traditional values—for contributing to an assault on the institution of marriage. In a visit to Georgia's predominantly Muslim neighbor Azerbaijan, the pope focused on interreligious dialogue and tolerance, steering clear of direct criticism against the increasingly authoritarian presidency of Ilham Aliyev. Under Mr. Aliyev, Azeri authorities have arrested scores of human-rights workers and members of political opposition groups, and have worked to cut local rights groups off from foreign funding while boosting the president's power. In an address to the president, the pope emphasized the importance of not "abusing the rights of others who have different ideas and perspectives," but otherwise praised the leader for efforts to promote civic growth.

- Sweden (31 October – 1 November)

In January 2016, sources reported that Francis would travel in October to Sweden for an ecumenical ceremony marking the 499th anniversary of the Protestant Reformation Day. It was later made official on 25 January 2016 that in the last week of October 2016 the pope would travel to the country for the commemoration as a one-day visit to the university town of Lund in Southern Sweden, though later altered to include another day in the nearby city of Malmö so that the pope could celebrate a Mass with the small Catholic numbers in Sweden. In Sweden he met the Church of Sweden's archbishop Antje Jackelén and also held a private audience with King Carl XVI Gustaf of Sweden and Queen Silvia of Sweden. It was during this visit the signed was Statement on the 500th anniversary of the Protestant Reformation with Pope Francis and Bishop Munib Younan in a special Catholic-Lutheran dialogue with theme From Conflict to Communion–Together in Hope.

=== 2017 ===
- Egypt (28–29 April)

President Abdel Fattah el-Sisi invited the pope to visit the nation in November 2014, when the pair met; the pope agreed to the visit. Pope Tawadros II also invited the pope to visit. The official ambassador delivered a formal invitation to the pope in June 2015. The Holy See announced on 18 March 2017 that the pope would indeed visit Egypt from 28 to 29 April.

Pope Francis visited Egypt from 28 to 29 April 2017, as "a messenger of peace". On his first day in Egypt, he arrived in Cairo and met with President Sisi. He later attended a peace conference at Al Azhar University in Cairo and met with various religious leaders, including the Grand Imam of Al Azhar Sheikh Muhammad Ahmed al-Tayeb and Coptic Orthodox Patriarch Pope Tawadros II. At the Saint Mark's Coptic Orthodox Cathedral, which was bombed in Palm Sunday 2017 and serves as Tawadros's Seat, the two popes signed a joint declaration which mutually declaring "not to repeat the baptism that has been administered in either of our churches for any person who wishes to join the other". He also held an ecumenical prayer service with Tawadros and Ecumenical Patriarch Bartholomew I at the St. Peter and St. Paul's Church, which was bombed by terrorists on 11 December 2016. The next day, he celebrated a Mass with approximately 15,000 people at Cairo's Air Defence Stadium.

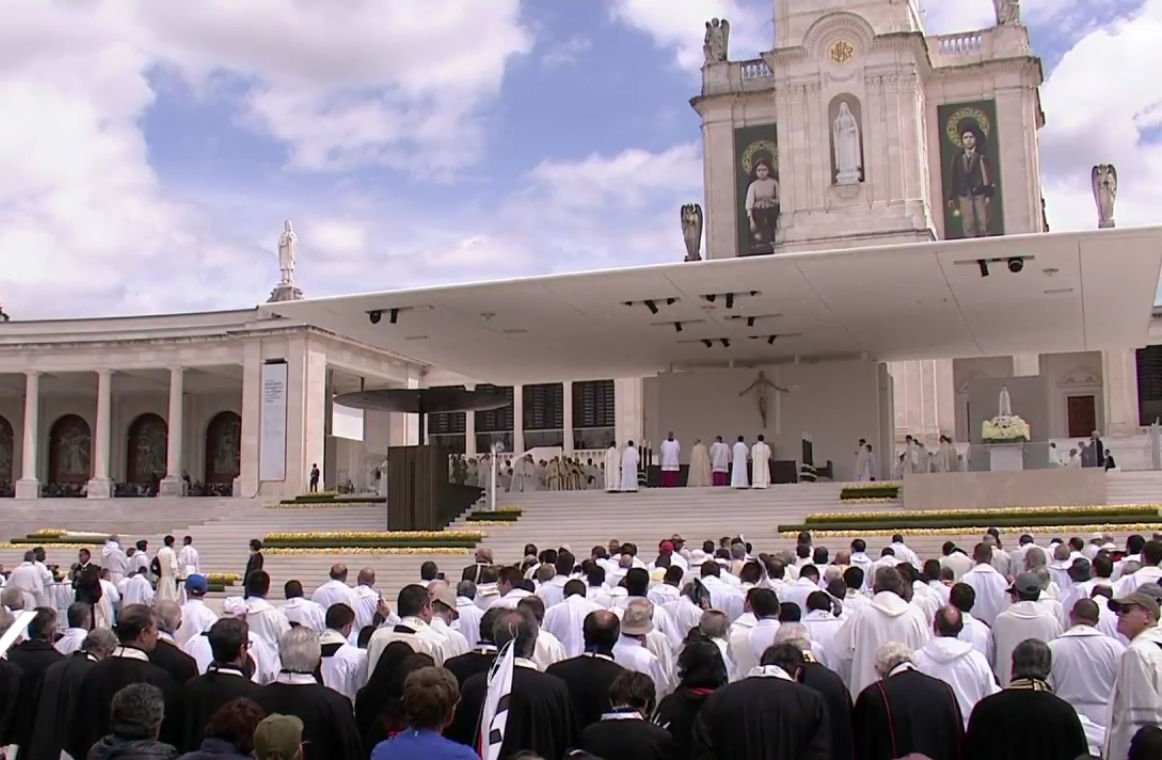
Pope Francis presides over the canonization of Francisco and Jacinta Marto in Fátima, Portugal on 13 May 2017.

- Portugal (12–13 May)

Bishop Antonio Marto announced that on 25 April 2015 the pope confirmed that he would visit Fátima in Portugal to mark the centenary of the apparition of Our Lady of Fátima. It was also made known that the government and Portuguese Episcopal Conference extended invitations to the pope. Pope Francis will also canonize Francisco and Jacinta Marto, two of the three seers of Fátima. It has been reported that the visit could take place from 11–14 May (in which the pope would visit Lisbon, Fátima and Braga) and could include the canonization of Bartholomew of Braga; the schedule was debunked when the pope himself stated that at the present time he shall only be there for one day in Fátima only, though a November 2016 report indicated it could be a two-day visit.

He arrived in Portugal on 12 May 2017 for a two-day visit after landing at Monte Real Portuguese Air Force base and was greeted by Portuguese President Marcelo Rebelo de Sousa. The Pope then held a private meeting with Sousa before holding a service at the base's chapel. He then traveled by helicopter to the Sanctuary of Fátima, where he prayed in front of a statue of the Madonna and held an evening prayer in front of the tens of thousands of pilgrims at the Sanctuary's Chapel of the Apparitions. He later presided over the traditional Blessing of the Candles in front of the Chapel's Our Lady of Fátima statue. The next day, the Pope met with Portuguese Prime Minister António Costa and prayed in front of the tombs of Francisco and Jacinta Marto. He then canonized both Francisco and Jacinta Marto as Catholic saints while presiding over a Mass for hundreds of thousands of pilgrims at the Sanctuary's Basilica of Our Lady of the Rosary; more pilgrims attending the Mass were located in Basilica's large square.

- Colombia (6–10 September)

Pope Francis reportedly intended to visit Colombia at the earliest possible chance. It was believed that it would happen during his 2015 Latin America tour, but it was revealed that it would happen later. In January 2016, the Holy See announced that a possible date for a potential visit would be sometime in 2017. It was later confirmed in January 2016 that the pope would indeed visit Colombia in 2017. The president said the pope would visit in the first quarter of 2017. However, the Holy See announced on 10 March 2017 that the trip was scheduled for 6 to 11 September. His visit was hoped to help solidify the Colombian peace process and encourage reconciliation.

Pope Francis arrived at Bogota International Airport on 6 September and was greeted by Colombian President Juan Manuel Santos, First Lady Maria Rodriguez, and the apostolic nuncio to Colombia, Ettore Balestrero, at the airport's adjacent air base. Random attendees also greeted him at the airport with many waiving white handkerchiefs to symbolize morale for the peace process. The son of former Vice Presidential candidate Clara Rojas, who was born in 2004 when his mother was still under FARC captivity, gave him a dove. Many reported mobbed the Popemobile as it drove the Pope to the country's Holy See Embassy in Bogota and some tossed Francis flowers and held up children for him to kiss.

On 7 September, Francis traveled from the Holy See Embassy to the Presidential Palace to endorse the peace in a message to President Santos and Colombia's political, cultural and economic elite. He then arrived at the Bogota Cathedral where he led a Mass which was attended by tens of thousands which encouraged reconciliation and the young to help lead the role in promoting forgiveness to heal country from its long struggle with the FARC rebellion; the Pope's crowd was hard reportedly hard to restraint as he arrived at Plaza Bolivar outside the Cathedral as well. At a message at the Bogota Archbishop's residence, Francis addressed Colombia's Bishops and encouraged them to play an important role in the peace process and uniting the local Catholic Church in a time of major division. Pope Francis later lead a Mass at Bogota's Simon Bolivar Park, which was once again attended by a crowd of tens of thousands and encouraged peace and national reconciliation. Later in the day, Francis returned to the Holy See Embassy and held a meeting with Cardinal Jorge Urosa, the Archbishop of Caracas, Venezuela, and the other Venezuelan Bishops as well; Cardinal Urosa described the current crisis in Venezuela as "very grave" and earlier in an interview with Bogota daily El Tiempo, the Venezuelan Cardinal described Venezuelan President Nicolas Maduro as "a dictator." The Pope also held a meeting with top cardinals and bishops from Latin America and the Caribbean to stress the vital role women play in the Catholic Church's survival, even noting the role his grandmother played in his own faith formation, while also insisting that the Church's ban on female clergy would remain intact.

On 8 September, Pope Francis produced a letter by former FARC leader Rodrigo Londono, better known by his nom de guerre of Timochenko, asking for forgiveness In his latter, Londono, who published the letter on the social media, stated that he hoped would convince Francis to understand that the Revolutionary Armed Forces of Colombia were always motivated by a sincere desire to stand up for the nation's poorest and most-excluded citizens. Later in the morning, Pope Francis arrived in Villavicencio. At Catama Field, tens of thousands of people gathered to see Pope Francis personally beatify two Colombian Catholic martyrs, Bishop Jesús Emilio Jaramillo Monsalve of Arauca and the "Martyr of Armero" Rev. Pedro María Ramírez Ramos, and lead a Mass encouraging peace, national reconciliation, and forgiveness. The Pope also visited Avalanche survivors in the town of Mocoa, located near Colombia's border with Ecuador, and also donned a blue striped poncho given to him by 10 local residents. Later, approximately 6,000 people filled Villavicencio's Las Malocas Park, located on the edge of the Amazon, where the Pope hosted a Homily promoting national reconciliation. At his Homily, the Pope heard personal testimony from at least two ex-FARC fighters and two Colombian conflict survivors, urged cooperation, and embraced victims and ex-fighters standing at the foot of the ruined torso of a statue of Christ that was rescued from a church destroyed in a 2002 mortar attack in Bojaya.

On 9 September, Pope Francis arrived in Medellin and consoled orphans, the poor and sick — while also demanding that priests and ordinary Colombians look beyond rigid church doctrine to care for sinners and welcome them in. Many cheered wildly and waved white handkerchiefs and Colombian flags as Francis zipped around the grounds in his Popemobile at an unusually fast clip to make up for lost time from a rain delay which forced him to cancel his planned helicopter flight and instead travel by land down the Andes, delaying the Mass by nearly an hour. During the Mass, which took place at Medillin's Enrique Olaya Herrera Airport and was held in both Latin and Spanish, Francis urged Colombia's conservative church to look beyond rigid rules and norms of church doctrine to go out and find sinners and minister to them. After the Mass, the Pope went to an orphanage to meet with abandoned children and the sick. He also had a meeting with priests, seminarians, nuns and their families in Medellin's La Macarena stadium before returning to Bogota for the night.

On 10 September, Pope Francis visited the port city of Cartagena, where there was a delay in his schedule after swarms of well-wishers caused him to lose balance while hanging onto the popemobile's hip-high bar and resulted in a bruised, black left eye, bruised cheekbone and a cut on his eyebrow that dripped blood onto his white cassock and which also required bandaging. He blessed the first stones of two institutions that will be built: one will offer a home to homeless people, and the other will house work of the Talitha Kum, an international network of the consecrated life, that helps the victims of human trafficking. He then visited a woman in a poor neighborhood of Cartagena identified as Mrs. Lorenza, who reportedly welcomes people in need daily, providing them with food and affection, After receiving medical treatment the Pope then visited the St. Peter Claver church, where he praised the 17th century missionary for having recognized the inherent dignity of slaves, recalling that the saint used to wait for the ships from Africa that brought the men and women forced into slavery to what was then the main center of commerce in slavery in the New World. He also denounced modern day human trafficking as a form of modern-day slavery as well. The Pope also called for an end to political violence in Venezuela and protection for the poor hurt by the nation's "grave" economic crisis. At approximately 7:30 pm on 10 September, Pope Francis left Colombia after an emotional farewell in which he was serenaded by the lively, traditional rhythms of the country's Carnival. Colombian President Juan Manuel Santos was on hand in Cartagena on Sunday to accompany Francis on the red carpet to the airliner which carried him to Rome. Wrapping up his five-day visit, the pope made a final appeal to Colombians to reconcile under the peace deal signed last year between the government and the biggest rebel group aimed at ending to end Latin America's longest-running conflict. The Colombian President also pledged to Pope Francis that Colombia will keep its doors open to thousands of Venezuelan exiles even as it works to find a political solution to its neighbor's crisis. Santos also says he told the pope in their final encounter Sunday that "Colombia will always be a welcoming land" and that he also gave Francis a pin of a symbolic peace dove that Santos has worn since the start of negotiations with leftist rebels several years ago.

- Myanmar and Bangladesh (27 November – 2 December)

On 2 October 2016, the pope stated that it was almost certain that he would undertake an apostolic visit to both India and Bangladesh sometime in 2017 as part of a tour to Asia yet hopes for a trip to India faded in 2017 since a visit could not be properly planned. Cardinal Patrick D'Rozario of Dhaka in Bangladesh announced that the dates for the pope's visit to Bangladesh and Myanmar would be from 23 November to 8 December, though he was cautious about confirming Myanmar as the second destination for the pope's Asia swing.

On 28 August 2017, the Holy See Press Office confirmed the visit to Myanmar. It happened between 27 and 30 November and was followed by a trip to neighboring Bangladesh between 30 November and 2 December. He was also the first Pope to visit Myanmar. The full programme was finalized on 10 October, and included trips to the capital city of Naypyidaw and Yangon while in Myanmar and Bangladesh's capital, Dhaka, on the second leg of Pope Francis's trip. He held Masses, visited various sites such as the Bangabandhu Memorial Museum and the local Mother Teresa House, and met with various government officials of both countries, including Htin Kyaw, Aung San Suu Kyi, and Abdul Hamid, as well as with others such as Catholic clergy, young people, civic society members, and the Supreme Council of Buddhist monks.

=== 2018 ===
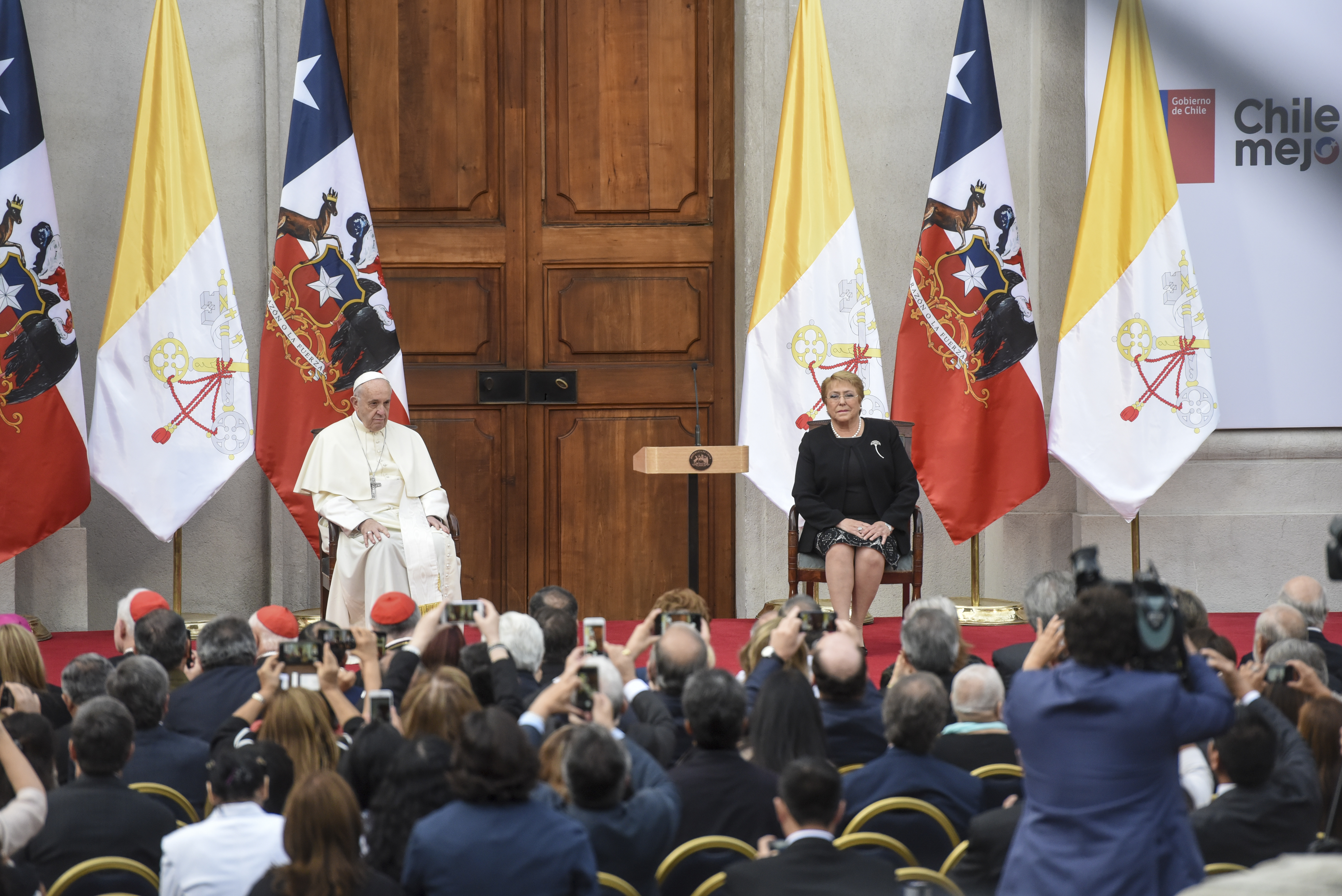
Act in the Patio de los Naranjos of the Palacio de La Moneda, Chile

- Chile and Peru (15–21 January)

The President of Chile Michelle Bachelet extended an invitation to the pope for a visit to the nation in 2016. On 19 June 2017, the Holy See announced that Pope Francis would visit Chile and Peru between 15 and 21 January 2018, beginning in Chile on 15 January, where he plans to visit Santiago, Temuco and Iquique. On 21 March 2017 the President of Peru Pedro Pablo Kuczynski sent a letter to Pope Francis inviting him for an official visit.

On 19 June 2017, the President and the Chargé d'Affaires of the Apostolic Nunciature of the Holy See in Peru Grzegorz Piotr Bielaszka announced that Francis plans to visit Peru in January 2018 and that the Minister of Labor Alfonso Grados would be responsible for the preparations. Francis will visit the cities of Lima, Trujillo and Puerto Maldonado. President Kuczynski announced that in September his will make the official invitation to the Pope in Vatican City.

On 15 January, Francis arrived in Chile in the midst of a tense atmosphere due to the burning of various churches and the takeover of the Apostolic Nunciature by the National Association of Mortgage Debtors, who protested the staggering cost of the pope´s visit. As a way to calm the rising tensions and welcome the pope without any major incidents, outgoing Chilean president, Michelle Bachelet, asked for calm from pope's detractors.

During the second day of his visit, Pope Francis had lunch with representatives of the various Mapuche communities as a way to calm the anger of the marginalized ethnic group, which called for violent protests upon his arrival. During the lunch meeting, the Mapuche representatives asked Francis to recognize the "Mapuche genocide", and also asked him to speak to government representatives as a way to obtain reparations for the numerous deaths of their members through history.

Another one of the big challenges that Francis faced in Chile was the low rate of credibility engulfing the Catholic Church due to the accusations of sexual abuse by clerics. In the middle of this crisis, Fernando Karadima, known as "the lord of hell" came to light, because he is considered the most harmful religious sexual offender in Chile. The pope came to the defense of bishop of Osorno Juan Barros, accused of covering up the sexual abuse allegations against Karadima. The pontiff said "the day someone brings forth proofs against Juan Barros I will speak. There is not one proof against him, it´s all a smear campaign ¿is it clear?" These words caused indignation for Karadima's victims.

On 18 January, the pope arrived in Lima, Peru, to a different atmosphere. Prior to leaving Chile, the pope met with families of people who had been executed by former Chilean dictator Augusto Pinochet during the 1970s. In Peru, the pope was received by 4,000 members of the indigenous communities from the Amazon rainforest. In the middle of dances and displays of affection, Francis said that the people of the Amazon were threatened now more than ever, and questioned the conservationist policies that affect the Peruvian rainforest.

In Puerto Maldonado, the pope had lunch with members of indigenous communities. There, he asked for the indigenous communities to be recognized as partners instead of minorities. "all the efforts we make in order to regain the life of the peoples of the Amazon will always be too few", he stated. The pope also called on the Peruvian people to put an end to practices that degrade women, and criticized the medical postures that promote the sterilization of indigenous women.

Finally, in the Government Palace in Lima, the pope criticized the "social virus" that affects Peru, corruption, during his speech. Francis said that corruption was the most damaging phenomenon to Latin American countries. On 21 January, over a million people flocked to a Peruvian airbase outside Lima on Sunday to attend the final Mass held by Pope Francis before he returned to Rome.

- Switzerland (21 June)

It was reported on 27 February 2018 that the pope was "studying" the prospects of visiting Geneva to address the World Council of Churches (WCC; the Catholic Church is not a member of this organisation) to discuss peace initiatives for Syria. It was confirmed the following day that the visit would go ahead in June after invitations extended by the Swiss government and the WCC itself were accepted. He then visited Geneva on 21 June and attended a ecumenical prayer service with various members of the WCC's 350 churches. His visit, which also included a meeting with WCC leaders as well as the Swiss President Alain Berset and other Swiss government officials, was the first papal visit either to Geneva or to the WCC headquarters, known as the WCC Ecumenical Centre, since 1982 and was also the first papal visit to be centered around an WCC meeting. He concluded his visit with a Mass for Catholics at Geneva's Palaexpo convention centre.

- Ireland (25–26 August)

Pope Francis chose Ireland to be the next host of the next World Meeting of Families scheduled for 2018, indicating his desire to visit around that time. The intended visit was confirmed in May 2016 and again on 29 November 2016 during a meeting between the pope and the head of state.

Pope Francis arrived in Dublin on 25 August and was greeted by the Apostolic Nuncio Archbishop Jude Thaddeus Okolo, Irish Tánaiste (deputy head of Ireland's government) Simon Coveney, Cardinal Kevin Farrell, the head of the Diacastery of Laity, Family and Life who has organized the World Meeting of Families, the President of the Irish Episcopal Conference, Archbishop of Armagh Eamon Martin, Archbishop of Dublin Diarmuid Martin, and other members of the hierarchy in Ireland. After arriving, Pope Francis gave a speech at Dublin Castle in front of a crowd of hundreds of politicians, civil servants, and others, when he praised the 20 years of peace between the Irish republicans and the United Kingdom which was a result of the 1998 Good Friday Agreement, and also expressed hope that Ireland and Northern Ireland could find ways to overcome their remaining differences. He also met Irish Taoiseach, or head of government, Leo Varadkar at the castle, and acknowledged and lamented the long history of sex abuse by Catholic clergy in Ireland. He also made a trip to the Presidential Palace to meet with Irish President Michael D. Higgins. The Pope made his way to silent prayer at the Candle of Innocence, which was dedicated in 2011 to honors victims of sex abuse, in St Mary's Pro-Cathedral in Dublin city centre and then made a surprise trip to the Capuchin Day Center for the homeless. He later held a one hour meeting with survivors of sex abuse after stating that young people had a right to be outraged at the response of senior figures in the Catholic church to the "repellent crimes." Thousands greeted the Pope as the Popemobile traveled throughout downtown Dublin and the first day of the Pope's visit concluded with a crowd of an estimated 82,500 attending the Festival of Families at Croke Park where various people, including country music singers, performed and gave testimony to the Pope.

On 26 August, Pope Francis arrived in County Mayo by plane and visited Knock Shrine, located in the Mayo village of Knock. He also addressed approximately pilgrims who visited the shrine and held a prayer service inside the shrine's chapel, where he prayed to the Virgin Mary for forgiveness for the sex abuse scandals. He then flew back to Dublin to celebrate Mass on Sunday at the Papal Cross in Phoenix Park, replicating Pope John Paul II's visit to Ireland in 1979. Before returning to Rome, Francis again met with Varadkar, who welcomed the Pope's call for action and forgiveness towards sex abuse. However, Varadkar also stating that Francis must act on his words as well.

- Estonia, Latvia, and Lithuania (22–25 September)

The apostolic nuncio to Estonia announced in November 2017 that Pope Francis would travel to the nation in the autumn sometime, with September being provided as a possible date. It was further related a week after that the pope would also be visiting neighboring Latvia and Lithuania; he would travel to all three to celebrate the centenary of their independence. The official confirmation for the visit will be made, according to media reports, in December 2017. The visit to the Baltic states was confirmed in a Holy See press release on 9 March 2018.

Pope Francis arrived at the airport in Lithuania's capital of Vilnius on 22 September, where he was welcomed by Lithuania's President Dalia Grybauskaite and other political and civilian representatives. He later spoke outside the Presidential palace, where he noted how both Nazi and Soviet occupations weakened religious tolerance in the country and honored "martyrs" who died during these occupations. He also called for unity between Catholics, Lutherans, and followers of Eastern Orthodox in the country. He also visited the Divine Mercy Shrine, which serves as a major pilgrimage destination for Poles from neighboring Poland, and held a prayer service there. On 23 September, he visited Lithuania's second largest city, Kaunas. Speaking in the city's Santakos Park to an estimated crowd of 100,000, the Pope honored the Jews who suffered oppression during the Nazi occupation between 1941 and 1944. Commemorating the Lithuanian Holocaust Memorial Day, the Pope condemned anti-Semitism which fueled Holocaust propaganda. He also paid tribute to Lithuanians who were deported to Siberian gulags or tortured and oppressed during five decades of Soviet occupation. He later returned to Vilnius to hold three-minutes of silent prayer at the Vilnius Ghetto's Holocaust memorial on the date which marked the 75th anniversary of the liquidation of Jews in the area and also laid flowers. He afterwards visited Vilnius' Museum of Occupations and Freedom Fights, a Museum containing items and papers detailing the long history of Soviet oppression in Lithuania and which once served as headquarters for the local branch of the now defunct Soviet KGB, where he also spoke in the outside square to praise Lithuanians who stood up for their faith and described the country as a potential "beacon of hope."

On 24 September, Pope Francis traveled to Latvia. Upon arriving at the airport in Latvia's capital of Riga, he met with Latvian President Raimonds Vejonis and the two travelled to the Presidential Palace. Commemorating Latvia's 100th anniversary of independence from Russian control, the Pope placed flowers at Latvia's Monument of Independence. At the Riga's main Lutheran Cathedral, he joined local Lutheran and Eastern Orthodox leaders at a music-filled ecumenical prayer and acknowledged the many trials Latvians endured during two Soviet occupations and the World War II-era occupation by Nazi Germany. Following this meeting, he held a prayer service in front of elderly Latvian Catholics who survived Nazi and Soviet occupations at Riga's main Catholic Cathedral, where he praised them for maintaining their faith during brutal occupations and called on them to use it to set an example. He repeated this message during a homily at the Mother of God Basilica in Aglona, which is considered to be Latvia's most important Catholic shrine, and also warned against isolationism.

On 25 September, Pope Francis concluded his four-day trip to the Baltic nations by visiting Estonia. He arrived at the airport in the Estonian capital of Tallinn. Pope Francis met with President Kersti Kaljulaid, and the two gave a public address at the Rose Garden in the Tallinn district of Kadriorg, where the Pope acknowledge how sex abuse scandals are driving people away from the church. Before leaving Estonia, Pope Francis held an outdoor Mass in front of a crowd of over 10,000 at Tallinn's Freedom Square.

=== 2019 ===
- Panama (23–27 January)

Pope Francis visited Panama for several days on the occasion of World Youth Day 2019; the venue was announced on 31 July 2016 at the end of World Youth Day 2016 held in Kraków, Poland. It was at the conclusion of his visit during the event's closing Mass that Cardinal Kevin Farrell announced that the 2022 World Youth Day would be held in Lisbon, Portugal.

- United Arab Emirates (3–5 February)

In June 2016 the pope received and accepted an invitation to visit the United Arab Emirates and the Holy See sent a letter to the nation's officials confirming a visit would take place at some point in the future. It was confirmed on 6 December 2018 that the pope would visit the United Arab Emirates in order to participate in the International Interfaith Meeting on "Human Fraternity" in Abu Dhabi.

On 3 February 2019 Pope Francis landed in the Abu Dhabi Presidential Airport at 9.47 p.m. local time where he was greeted by Sheikh Mohamed bin Zayed, Crown Prince of Abu Dhabi and Deputy Supreme Commander of the UAE Armed Forces and then Dr Ahmed el-Tayeb, Grand Imam of Al Azhar University, which serves as the lead source for Sunni Islam education, and Chairman of the Muslim Council of Elders. This visit also makes him the first Pope to visit an area in the Arabian Peninsula. On 4 February, the Pope attended the Interfaith Meeting, during which he and el-Tayeb signed “A Document on Human Fraternity for World Peace and Living Together.” The same day, The Pope spoke at the Abu Dhabi Founder's Memorial, held a meeting with el-Tayeb and other Muslim elders at the Sheikh Zayed Grand Mosque, and held a meeting with Crown Prince Zayed at the Presidential Palace. On 5 February, Pope Francis concluded his trip after celebrating the Holy Mass in front of a large crowd, estimated at 180,000, at Zayed Sports City.

- Morocco (30–31 March)

The Holy See Press Office confirmed on 13 November 2018 that, upon being invited by King Mohammed VI and the nation's bishops, Pope Francis would visit Morocco in late March 2019 for two-days, and that he would visit Rabat and Casablanca. However, the Pope's schedule, released on 26 February, included visits to Rabat and Temara, but did not include a trip to Casablanca.

On 30 March 2019, Pope Francis arrived at Rabat-Salé International Airport in the Moroccan capital of Rabat, where he was greeted by King Mohammed VI. The Pope and the Moroccan King then held a parade before arrived at the Hassan tower complex, where the Pope delivered a speech praising Morocco's efforts to promote an Islam that repudiates extremism, urged the nation to continue offering migrants welcome and protection, and said it was "essential" for all believers to counter religious fanaticism and extremism with solidarity, and described religious extremism "an offense against religion and against God himself." The Pope also visited Rabat's landmark Mausoleum of Mohammed V, commemorated his visit by sign the mausoleum's "Book of Honour," and prayed for better "brotherhood and solidarity" between Christians and Muslims over the tombs of King Mohammed V, known as the founder of modern-day Morocco, and Mohammed V's son, as well as Mohammed VI's father, King Hassan II before meeting with Mohammad VI, who called for better dialogue and education within the world's entire religious community, and his extended family. During their meeting at the Royal Palace, the Pope and Moroccan King signed a joint declaration calling for, in the name of Amir al-Mu'minin, the recognition and preservation of "the Holy City of Jerusalem/Al-Quds Acharif" and for Israel to recognize the city as a place where Jews, Muslims and Christians all have “full freedom of access,” can use as "a meeting place and symbol of peaceful coexistence," and can "raise their prayers to God, the creator of all, for a future of peace and fraternity on the earth.”

The Pope afterwards visited a Caritas Catholic charity caring for the migrants who flocked to Morocco in order to seek passage to Europe. During this visit, the Pope spoke in front of a group of migrants, where he denounced the "merchants of human flesh" who traffic in desperation, expressed support for greater legal channels for migration, and stated that all migrants, regardless of their legal status, deserved protection, particularly the most vulnerable children and women. The Pope and Moroccan King then visited the Mohammed VI Institute, which trains students from across the world to be Islamic imams, preachers and instructors and even allows women to be trained as preachers. During this visit, the Pope and Mohammed VI held conversations with students, male and female. One notable testimony came from a female student from Nigeria. Two of the 30 March events were also attended by Jewish and Christian leaders.

On 31 March, Pope Francis visited a social care center in Temara which is led by three nuns who are members of the Daughters of Charity of Saint Vincent de Paul. The Pope also held a Mass in Rabat’s Cathedral of Saint Peter. The Mass was attended in Morocco's small Christian community, included some of those from the country's low number of priests and sisters. The Pope concluded his visit to Morocco after delivering a Mass at Rabat's Prince Moulay Abdellah Stadium in front of a record breaking crowd of 10,000, most of migrants from countries in sub-Sahara Africa.

- Bulgaria and North Macedonia (5–7 May)

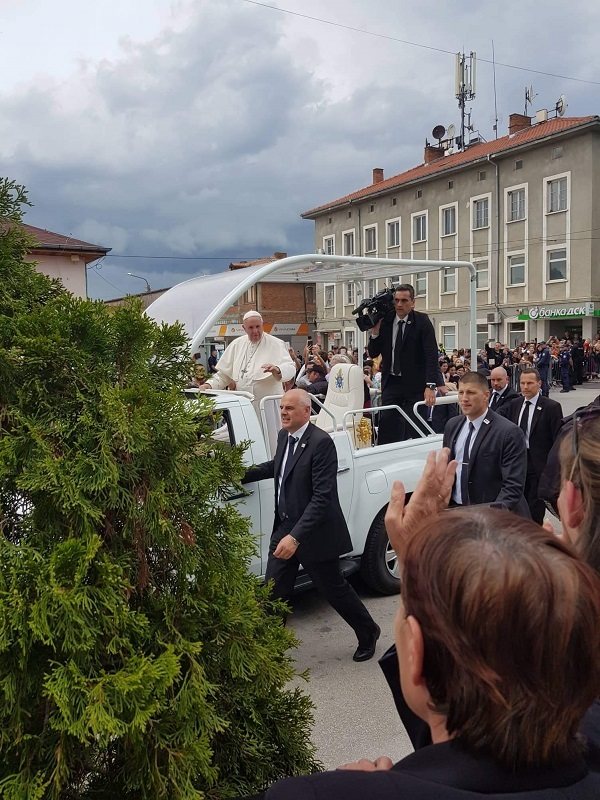
Pope Francis in Sekirovo, Bulgaria

An announcement was made on 13 December 2018 that the pope would visit Bulgaria from 5 to 7 May, while visiting North Macedonia following this on 7 May. He would visit Sofia and Rakovski in Bulgaria, and Skopje in North Macedonia.

On 5 May 2019, Pope Francis arrived in Bulgaria after landing at Sofia Airport, where he was greeted by Bulgarian Apostolic Nuncio, Archbishop Anselmo Guido Pecorari, the Head of Protocol, and Bulgarian Prime Minister Boyko Borisov. He then went into the airport's government lounge, where he held a meeting with Borisov. The Pope also visited Sofia's St. Alexander Nevsky Orthodox Cathedral to hold a public meeting with Orthodox Patriarch Neophyte, though both addressed the Bulgarian Orthodox Church's Metropolitans and Bishops of the Holy Synod. Neophyte ruled out suggestions of him or anybody in the Bulgarian Orthodox Church holding any joint interfaith prayer or church services with the pope. Speaking to thousands at a Mass in Sofia's Prince Alexander I Square, Pope Francis encouraged Bulgaria to become more accepting of migrants.

On 6 May, Pope Francis arrived in Rakovski. Following his arrival, the pope held his first communion during his visit to Bulgaria in the town's Sacred Heart Church. Approximately 10,700 of the town's approximately 20,000 residents attended. During the Communion, Francis also delivered a homily, which was directed to the 242 children in the predominately Catholic town, who received their first communion, and he again encouraged Bulgaria to be more accepting of migrants. He afterwards returned to Sofia to lead a prayer session in Independence Square, which was attended by not only Catholics, but members of the Orthodox, Jewish, Muslim, Armenian and Protestant communities. During the event, which was the last public event during his Bulgarian trip, invoked the papal encyclical Pacem in terris as a code of conduct for peace between Catholics and other faiths; the encyclical had been published by Pope John XXIII, who once served as the Holy See's representative to Bulgaria. Roses were present to represent Bulgaria, which is known for its production of roses and rose oil, and six candles were lit it to represent the six religions in attendance.

On 7 May, Pope Francis traveled to St. Mother Teresa's birthplace of Skopje, North Macedonia, which also serves as the nation's capital. Shortly after arriving, the pope visited Skopje's Mother Teresa Memorial House. While at the Memorial, the pope prayed in front of the chapel relics for Teresa's legacy to live on and greeted a number of poor people who have been aided by her organization Missionaries of Charity. He also praised North Macedonia's willingness to be more accepting of different ethnicities and cultures and held talks with outgoing president Gjorge Ivanov concerning issues facing North Macedonia, which recently underwent a name change to end a longtime dispute with Greece. Despite the country's incredibly small Catholic community, around 15,000 attended a Mass which Pope Francis held in Macedonia Square, where he encouraged young people and Catholic church workers to look to St. Mother Teresa as a role model.

- Romania (31 May – 2 June)

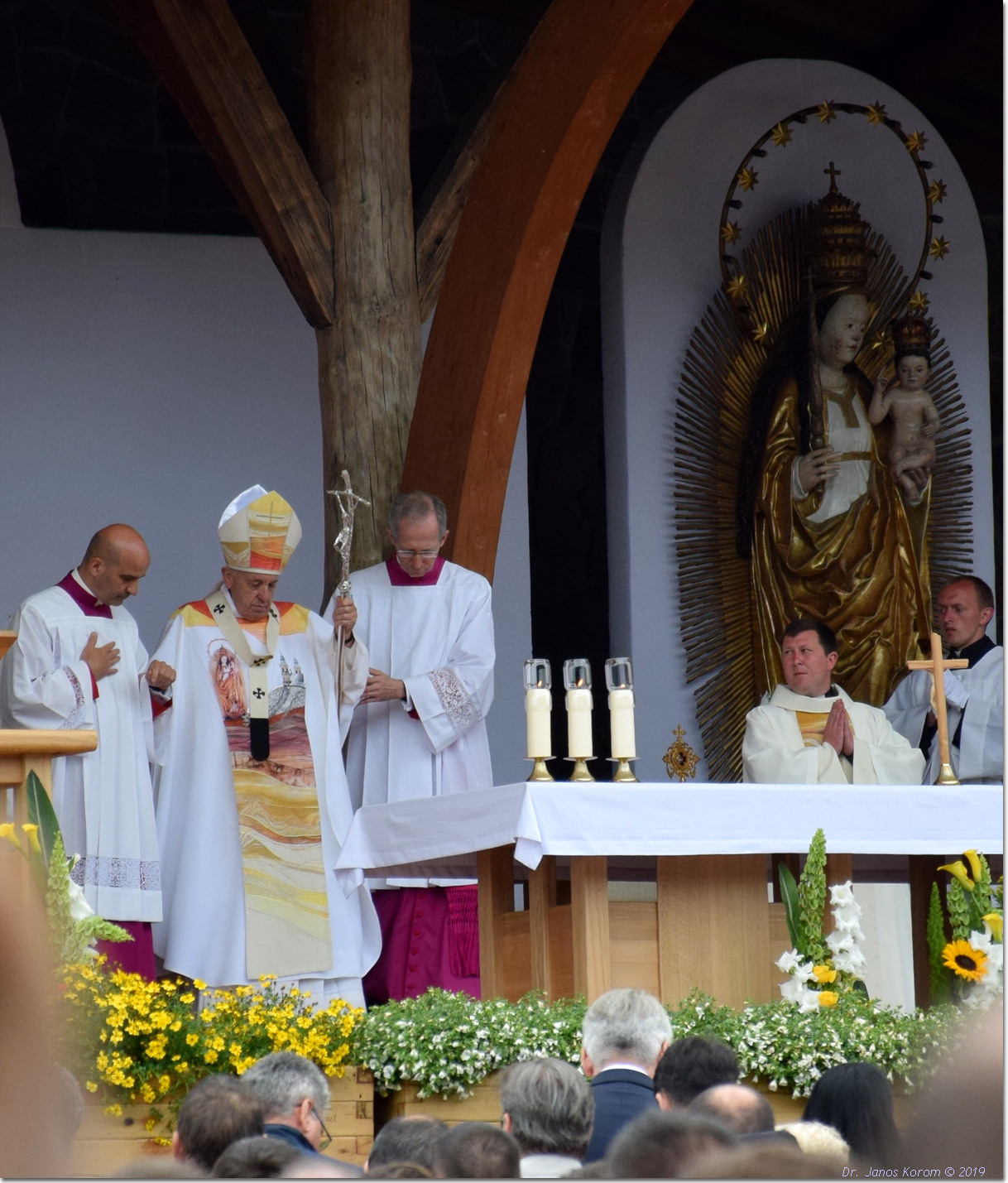
Pope Francis in Șumuleu Ciuc, Romania

In May 2015, the President of Romania Klaus Iohannis issued an open invitation to the pope to visit the nation. The visit was hoped to coincide with the 2018 commemoration of the centenary of the Great Union, supported in 2017 by the Romanian episcopate for a visit in late 2018, when seven martyrs of communism could be beatified. The pope later assured the Prime Minister on her visit to the Vatican on 11 May 2018 that he would visit in early 2019. The Holy See announced on 11 January 2019 that the visit would take place from 31 May to 2 June and that the pope would visit three cities plus a sanctuary in a fourth city. Francis is also expected to beatify seven martyrs on 2 June 2019 while in Blaj.

On 31 May 2019 the Pope arrived in Romania after landing at Henri Coandă Airport in the nation's capital of Bucharest, where he was welcomed by the country’s president Klaus Iohannis, Iohannis' wife Carmen, and a group of Catholic school teachers and school children. The Pope afterwards was driven through the capital where crowds lined the streets to see his motorcade. At the Presidential Palace, known as the Cotroceni Palace, he held a meeting with Iohannis, Prime Minister Viorica Dăncilă, and the country's religious leaders, where he suggested that supporting poor and other disadvantaged Romanians was the key to building success in Romania. After the meeting ended, the pope gave a public address at the Cotroceni Palace, where he warned that although great steps had been taken since the fall of Communism, the country still faces danger with the rise of nationalist populism. While at the Palace, the Pope also exchanged gifts with Dăncilă. He also visited Dealul Mitropoliei, the headquarters of the Romanian Orthodox Church, where he met the General Synod of the Romanian Orthodox Church and again with the head of the church, Patriarch Daniel. Francis and Daniel then traveled to the new Orthodox People's Salvation Cathedral, which has yet to complete construction, where Pope Francis called for joint communion between Catholics and the Orthodox Church to be restored, and recited the Lord's Prayer jointly with Daniel, Francis in Latin, followed by Daniel in Romanian. He concluded the first day his visit to Romania by delivering a homily in front of a jam-packed crowd at Saint Joseph Cathedral, where he further endorsed women's rights and based the meeting between Elizabeth and Mary in the Gospel as Christian justification to maintain and expand it.

On 1 June, Pope Francis delivered a Mass at the Marian Shrine of Șumuleu Ciuc (originally in Hungarian: Csíksomlyó) in the historical region of Transylvania, where, while speaking in the rain to an estimated crowd of 80,000 to 100,000, he suggested past troubles should not be a barrier to co-existence and asked the Mary to "teach us to weave the future." The sanctuary, which is located in Eastern Carpathians, is also a site of Szeklerland heritage and of pilgrimage for Hungarian and Romanian Catholics. He afterwards traveled to Iași, in the historical region of Moldavia, where he was welcomed by more than 100,000 people. The pope delivered a short Mass at the Our Lady Queen of Iași Cathedral and met with young people and families in the Iași Palace Square, in front of the city's Palace of Culture. In Palace of Culture Square, Pope Francis also heard testimony from these families and delivered a speech calling for unity between Catholics and the Orthodox Church and cited words from, among other things, Romania's national poet, Mihai Eminescu, and a story told about the monk Galaction Ilie of Sihăstria Monastery, a prominent institution of Romanian Orthodoxy, as examples of why Christians should unite.

On 2 June, Pope Francis returned to Transylvania and traveled to Blaj, where, while speaking on the city's Câmpia Libertății in front of 100,000 people, he beatified seven martyred Greek Catholic Bishops who, as a result of the refusal to switch to the Orthodox Church in 1948, were arrested, investigated and died in communist prisons or in compulsory detentions between 1950 and 1970, while also warning of new ideologies that will possibly take over and replicate the oppression during Romania's Communist rule as well. While in Blaj, the Pope also held a meeting with members of the Romanian Roma community, where he acknowledged the Catholic Church's history of promoting "discrimination, segregation and mistreatment" against Roma people throughout the world, apologized, and asked the gypsies for forgiveness. Klaus and Carmen Iohannis met with, and also waived goodbye to the Pope, as he boarded his plane at Sibiu Airport, and departed Romania following his three day visit to the country.

- Mozambique, Madagascar, and Mauritius (4–10 September)

In October 2018, Cardinal Désiré Tsarahazana remarked to reporters that Pope Francis would visit Madagascar in 2019, though the Holy See spokesman Greg Burke said that the visit was under consideration, and not definitively confirmed. In January 2019 the country's apostolic nuncio confirmed that the pope would visit three cities (Antananarivo, Toamasina, and Morondava) and that September was being viewed as a possible time for the pope to visit. The President of Mozambique Filipe Nyusi eagerly extended an invitation to Pope Francis to visit the nation in 2019. Pope Francis said, "If I'm alive, I will". The Holy See did not confirm at the time whether it signified a visit in 2019 but that it would be under consideration.

The Holy See Press Office confirmed the pope would visit Mozambique and Madagascar in addition to Mauritius in September in a release on 27 March 2019. On 30 August 2019, the Holy See announced that Pope Francis would visit a Catholic-run HIV treatment center during his visit to Mozambique's capital of Maputo between 5–6 September.

On 4 September 2019, Pope Francis arrived in Mozambique after his plane landed at the airport in the nation's capital of Maputo at around 6:00 pm local time. He is the first Pope to visit Mozambique since John Paul II in 1988. Upon arrival at the airport, Pope Francis was welcomed by President Nyusi, two children offering flowers, military honors, and native dancers. Huge crowds also lined the streets as the Pope was driven to the nation's apostolic nunciature, where he stayed during his visit to Mozambique.

On 5 September, Pope Francis traveled to the Ponta Vermelha Presidential Palace, where he meet with Nyusi and leader of the opposition Ossufo Momade and delivered a speech praising their recent peace agreement and urged to them to also preserve their "peace and reconciliation" as well. He also expressed solidarity with people affected by Cyclones Idai and Kenneth and urged resistance of draining resource and giving in to foreign interests by damaging the environment. In his second engagement in Mozambique, the Pope traveled to the Cathedral of the Immaculate Conception, where he met with "bishops, priests, religious men and women, seminarians and cathechists" and delivered a speech calling on them to acknowledge the country's crisis regarding "AIDS, an orphaned child, a grandmother taking care of many grandchildren, or a young person who came to the city and is desperate because he or she cannot find a job" and cited passages in the Bible as justification for combating these issues. Pope Francis also stated that while combating these issues has given Catholic figures "weariness and worriness," they still must continue combating these issues and not give into commercial products as a relief. He afterwards held an inter-religious rally at Maxaquene Pavilion, which was attended by a large crowd of young people. The Pope also told the people in attendance that they were "important" because they "not only are you the future of Mozambique, of the church and of humanity,” but also "their present."

On 6 September, Pope Francis visited Zimpeto Hospital, and called for further assistance in combating the HIV/AIDS crisis in Mozambique. The Pope afterwards concluded his visit to Mozambique following a Mass in front of an estimated capacity crowd of 42,000 people at Zimpeto Stadium. During this Mass, Pope Francis, who spoke in the cold rain denounced political and business leaders in the country who gave into pressure from outsiders, blaming them for corruption in the country, and further stated that Mozambique had a "right to peace." Following the Mass, Pope Francis departed for Madagasgar and landed at 4pm local time at the airport in the country's capital of Antananarivo, where he was greeted at airport the by Madagascar President Andry Rajoelina, his wife Mialy Rajoelina, an official delegation of bishops. Two children in traditional dress offered him flowers and a crowd of 300 faithful Catholics also attended the welcome ceremony at the airport. The Pope was then taken to the nation's apostolic nunciature, he was greeted by a choir which sang two local hymns in his honor. The Pope, who stayed at the nunciature during his visit to Madagascar, was also greeted by other people present.

On 7 September, Pope Francis met with President Rajoelina and other political leaders at the Iavoloha Presidential Palace, completed in 1975 with funding from North Korea, encouraging them to do more to protect Madagascar's ecosystem and fight corruption and poverty. The President afterwards led the Pope into the ceremonial building to address Madagascar’s civil authorities, the diplomatic corps and the religious leaders. and delivered a speech encouraged them to "recognize, esteem, and appreciate this blessed land for its beauty and its priceless natural resources" and also follow Fr. Antoine de Padoue Rahajarizafy's example of embracing "aina." The Pope afterwards recited midday prayer in the Monastery of Discalced Carmelites. While meeting with Madagascar's Catholic Bishop in the Cathedral of Andohal Following a meeting with three religious leaders, Pope Francis visited the tomb of Blessed Victoire Rasoamanarivo, located in the Cathedral's chapel, where he stopped to pray and blessed the image of her. He afterwards held a "Vigil With The Young" at Soa Mandrakizay diocesan field, Speaking for the crowd, estimated to be 1 million, the pope encouraged Madagascar's youth not to fall into "bitterness" or to lose hope, even when they lacked the "necessary minimum" to get by and when "educational opportunities were insufficient."

On 8 September, Pope Francis returned to Soa Mandrakizay field to deliver a homily in front of a crowd also estimated to be at 1 million. Speaking at the homily, which some believe was the largest public gathering in the country's history, Pope Francis encouraged the people of Madagascar "to build history in fraternity and solidarity" and "in complete respect for the earth and its gifts, as opposed to any form of exploitation." Following lunch with the papal entourage at the nunciature, Pope Francis went to the Antananarivo settlement of Akamasoa, where he and Father Pedro Opeka, who founded the settlement, gave a joint speech to the community, with the pope declaring Akamasoa an example that "poverty is not inevitable!" The Pope then held a prayer service at the Mahatzana worksite, where he praised adults who "work with their hands and with immense physical effort" and "soothe their wearied frames, that they may tenderly caress their children and join in their games." The apostolic portion of his visit to Madagascar then concluded with priests, men and women religious, consecrated persons, seminarians, novices and postulants at Saint Michel College, an institute in Antananarivo which was founded by French Jesuit missionaries in 1888, where he encouraged them to "be a sign of His living presence" and fight their battles in prayer and in praise.

On 9 September, Pope Francis briefly departed Madagascar after landing at the Port Louis International Airport in Mauritius, where he was welcomed by Prime Minister Pravind Kumar Jugnauth, Cardinal Maurice Piat and two children offering flowers. After the welcome ceremony, Pope Francis traveled to the Monument of Mary, Queen of Peace, where he was greeted by waving palm branches carried by many of the nearly 80,000 people present. During the Mass, Pope Francis acknowledged the importance of providing happiness for young people, described the Beatitudes as a "Christian identity card," and celebrated the feast of Blessed Jacques-Désiré Laval. At the end of the celebration, Card. Piat announced that the bishops have asked for 100 thousand trees to be planted to commemorate the visit. Francis then dined in the episcopate of Port Louis with the 5 Bishops of the CEDOI (Episcopal Conference of the Indian Ocean). The Pope later visited Jugnauth, interim President Barlen Vyapoory, civil society leaders and the diplomatic corps at the Presidential palace, where he also gave a speech condemning Mauritius's status as a tax haven and urging the political leaders to combat this problem. The Pope then departed Mauritius and flew back to Madagascar following a farewell ceremony.

On 10 September, an Air Madagascar Airbus plane transported Pope Francis from the Antananarivo International Airport and back to Rome. Before his departure, Madagascar’s President, other political authorities, the nation’s bishops, and a crowd of faithful were at the airport to attend a farewell ceremony, and the Guard of Honour gave him a final salute. Traditionally, a Pope’s outbound flight is always by Italy’s national airline Alitalia, while the national airline of the country he is leaving is the one to bring him back home.

- Thailand and Japan (19–26 November)

On 19 August 2019, Reuters announced that Pope Francis would visit Thailand before making a trip to Japan. He was the first Pope to visit Thailand since John Paul II in 1984. He visited Thailand from 20 to 23 November.

Prime Minister Shinzo Abe invited Pope Francis to visit Japan when they met on 6 June 2013 and the pope expressed his willingness to go there. On 30 July 2016 the Holy See was reportedly considering a papal visit to Japan in 2017 with the government hoping that it could be scheduled to coincide with a visit to Indonesia. In late 2018 Pope Francis expressed his willingness to visit Japan, possibly in November 2019, affirmed this plan whilst talking to reporters on 23 January 2019 and the next day Cardinal Thomas Aquino Manyo Maeda, Archbishop of Osaka, said the visit would take place in the second half of November and include Tokyo, Hiroshima and Nagasaki. The only pope to previously visit Japan was Pope John Paul II in 1981.

The latest schedule was published on 28 October 2019. In Thailand, the pope visited Bangkok and Sampran, whilst in Japan, he went to Tokyo, Nagasaki, and Hiroshima. In Japan, Pope Francis expressed opposition to both nuclear weapons and nuclear energy, at one point stating that “Important decisions will have to be made about the use of natural resources and future energy sources in particular” and that “Our age is tempted to make technological progress the measure of human progress."

=== 2021 ===
- Iraq (5–8 March)

On 7 December 2020, Holy See Press Director Matteo Bruni released a statement confirming that Pope Francis would make his first international apostolic visit in 15 months after accepting the invitation of the Republic of Iraq and the local Catholic Church to visit the Middle Eastern country of Iraq from 5–8 March 2021. According to the Holy See Press Office statement, Pope Francis “will visit Baghdad, the plain of Ur, linked to the memory of Abraham, the city of Erbil, as well as Mosul and Qaraqosh in the plain of Nineveh.” Cardinal Louis Raphael Sako, the Patriarch of Babylon of the Chaldeans, affirmed that Pope Francis would visit the country as well. It was also revealed that preparation for the visit were nearing completion early in 2020, when he met the President of Iraq, Barham Salih, at an audience in the Vatican on 25 January of that year. Pope Francis became the first Pope to ever visit Iraq. During his visit to Iraq, Pope Francis visited the Iraqi cities and regions which were on the original Holy See schedule and also made an additional visit to Najaf. Among those Pope Francis met with during his Iraq visit was top Shiite cleric Grand Ayatollah Ali al-Sistani, who the Pope visited in Najaf and with whom he issued a joint statement denouncing extremism.

- Hungary and Slovakia (12–15 September)

Pope Francis visited Budapest on the occasion of the closing Mass for the 52nd Eucharistic Congress. He also visited Slovakia for 4 days from September 12 to September 15. He visited Bratislava, Prešov, Košice and Šaštín.

- Cyprus and Greece (2–6 December)

The Holy See officially announced on 5 November 2021 that Pope Francis will travel to Cyprus and Greece on 2–6 December. The four-day trip to the two Mediterranean countries included stops in Nicosia, the capital of Cyprus, Athens, the Greek capital, and the Greek island of Lesbos. The pope visited Cyprus on 2–4 December before flying to Athens on 4 December and Lesbos on 5 December. It was Pope Francis’ second trip to Lesbos, also known as Lesvos, an island that is home to the infamous Moria refugee camp that was damaged in a fire last year.

=== 2022 ===
- Malta (2–3 April)

Pope Francis visited the island nation of Malta. This pastoral visit was originally planned for the Solemnity of Pentecost, on May 31, 2020.

- Canada (24–30 July)

Pope Francis visits Canada to apologise for crimes committed by religious leaders in the country, notably in relation towards the Canadian Indian residential school system. During his visit, he met with the native population and visited two Shrines in the country.

- Kazakhstan (13–15 September)

The Pope visited Nur-Sultan to participate in the 7th Congress of Leaders of World and Traditional Religions.

- Bahrain (3–6 November)

Pope Francis attended the Bahrain Forum for Dialogue: East and West for Human Coexistence and met with Bahrain’s King Hamad bin Isa Al Khalifa.

=== 2023 ===
- Democratic Republic of the Congo and South Sudan (31 January – 5 February)

On 1 November 2022, during an online conference with African students, Pope Francis confirmed that a trip to the Democratic Republic of the Congo (DRC) and South Sudan was being prepared for early February 2023. The itinerary was announced by the Holy See on 1 December 2022. An estimated 1 million people attended a Mass he held in the Democratic Republic of Congo's capital of Kinshasa on 1 February. on 2 February, he would address 65,000 people at Kinshasa's Martyr's Stadium. He is the first Pope to visit the country since Pope John Paul II did so in 1985. On 3 February, Pope Francis left the DRC and flew to South Sudan. After arriving in South Sudan's capital of Juba, the Pope traveled with Anglican Archbishop of Canterbury Justin Welby and Moderator of the Church of Scotland Iain Greenshields to the Presidential Palace, where the pope issued a joint "pilgrimage of peace" address with his Anglican and Scottish Presbyterian counterparts. This would mark the first time in history that a Pope travelled with either the Archbishop of Canterbury or the Moderator of the Church of Scotland. On February 4, the Pope, Welby and Greenshields held a joint ecumenical prayer service at the John Garang Mausoleum in Juba which was reported to have been attended by 50,000. On 5 February, Pope Francis flew out of South Sudan following a joint Mass with Welby and Greenshields at the John Garang Mausoleum which was reported to have been attended by 100,000 people.

- Hungary (28–30 April)

On Monday, 27 February 2023, the Press Office of the Holy See confirmed the Pope's second visit to Hungary, from Friday, 28 April to Sunday, 30 April 2023. Pope Francis would land in Hungary's capital of Budapest on April 28. After arriving the Pope traveled to Sándor Palace, the official residency of the President of Hungary, where he greeted the Hungarian President, Prime Minister, and other Hungarian officials. At the Palace he held a private meetings, first with Hungarian President Katalin Novák and then with Hungarian Prime Minister Viktor Orbán. Novák also accompanied the Pope as he entered the Palace. During a mass at St Stephen's Basilica, Pope Francis commemorated the life of bishops, priests, monks and nuns who were murdered during Hungary's Communist rule, including Cardinal Jozsef Mindszenty. On 29 April, the Pope met with young people at László Papp Budapest Sports Arena and visited the St. Elizabeth Greek Catholic Church for a public prayer. He also met with some Ukrainian refugees and the Russian Orthodox Church leader Patriarch Kirill, while also maintaining the Vatican's historical neutral stance in wars. On April 30, Pope Francis delivered a mass from the banks of the Danube in Budapest’s Kossuth Lajos Square, with the Hungarian Parliament and Budapest’s famed Chain Bridge as a backdrop, with 100,000 people estimated to be in attendance, including Prime Minister Victor Orbán and President Katalin Novák, who estimated that hundreds of thousands of faithful attended the mass. Before leaving the country, the Pope also delivered a speech at Pázmány Péter Catholic University.

- Portugal (2–6 August)

It was announced during the closing Mass for the Panama 2019 World Youth Day that the event would be held in Lisbon in 2022 after the nation put in an offer in 2017 to host the event. The pope reiterated an earlier statement that either he or his successor would attend. On 20 April 2020, however, the event was postponed to August 2023 due to the COVID-19 pandemic "and its consequences for the movement and gathering of young people and families." Pope Francis arrived in Portugal on 2 August to begin his five day visit to the country.

- Mongolia (31 August – 4 September)

Departing the night of 31 August, the pope arrived in the capital of Ulaanbaatar on 1 September after a 10-hour flight. On 2 September, the pope met with political and religious leaders in the country. Pope Francis became the first pope to visit Mongolia. His trip was noted as furthering his mission to give attention to smaller Catholic populations, with only an estimated 1,450 Catholics living in Buddhist-majority Mongolia.

- France (22–23 September)

Pope Francis confirmed his intention to travel to Marseille on the occasion of the Meeting of the Bishops of the Mediterranean. Pope Francis arrived in Marseille on 22 September and delivered a speech urging tolerance for migrants. As part of his meeting with Bishops of the Mediterranean, Pope Francis also held an inter-religious prayer service at the city's memorial for sailors and migrants lost at sea. On 23 September, Pope Francis met with French President Emmanuel Macron and held a mass before tens of thousands of people at Marseille Stadium.

=== 2024 ===
- Indonesia, Papua New Guinea, Timor-Leste and Singapore (2–13 September)

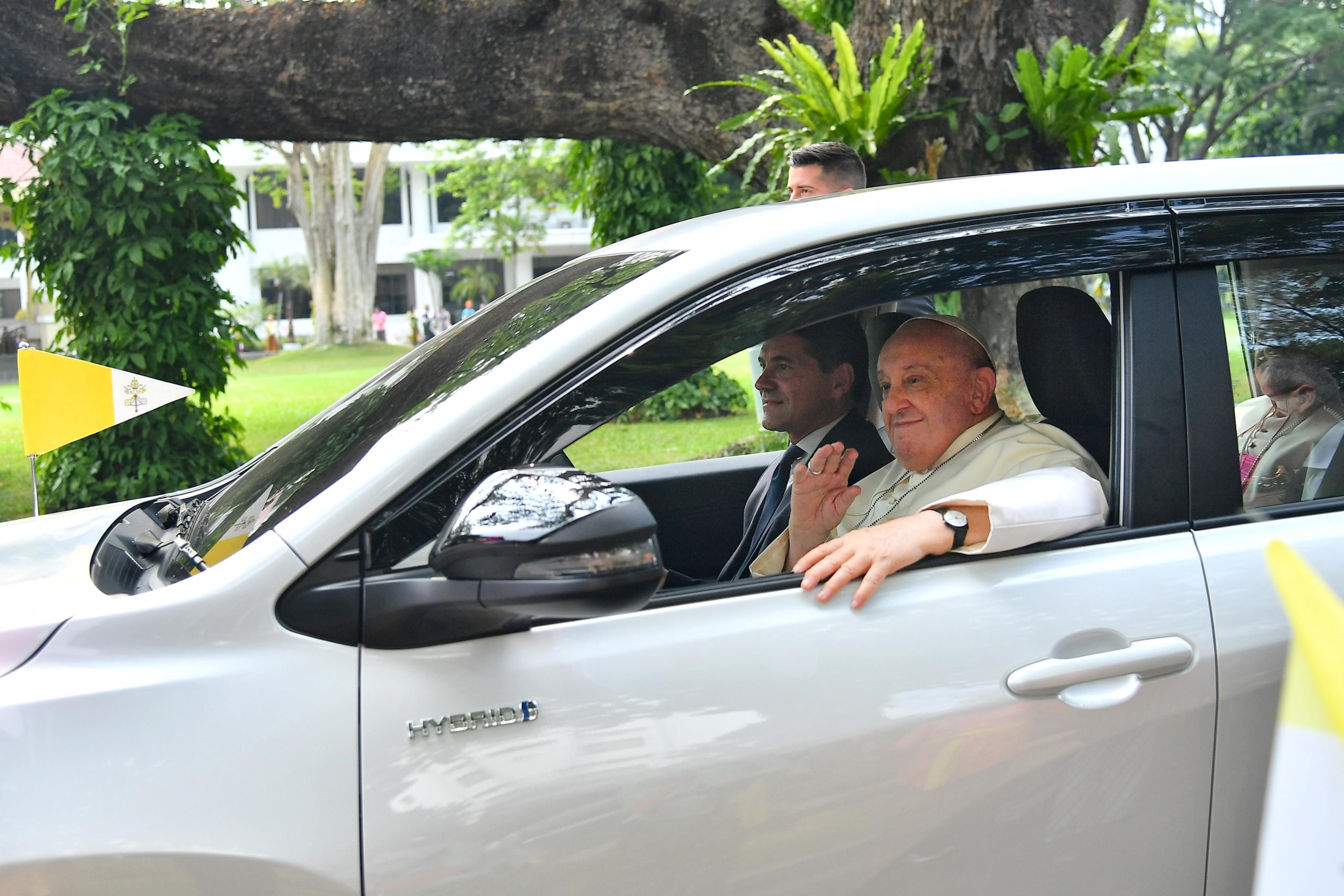
Pope Francis arrives at the Merdeka Palace in a Toyota Zenix, after refusing to use a luxury car, opting to be driven in a car used by everyday Indonesians.

In early April 2024, Vatican Secretary of State Paul R. Gallagher revealed the Pope's plan to visit some countries in the Asia-Pacific region, including Indonesia. Pope Francis is the third pope to visit this country after Pope Paul VI on 3–4 December 1970 and Pope John Paul II on 8–12 October 1989. Pope Francis arrived in Jakarta on 3 September where he was welcomed by some Indonesian ministers. He later went to the Embassy of the Vatican to Indonesia and stayed there, choosing this place over a private hotel. In the next day, he received a welcoming ceremony at the Merdeka Palace courtyard, meeting with President of the Republic of Indonesia Joko Widodo, other government officials, civil society and the diplomatic corps at the State Palace Hall. He then went to Jakarta Cathedral to meet with Indonesian Bishops, Priests, Deacons, Consecrated Life Workers, Seminarians and Catechists. He also met with Young Scholars at Graha Pemuda. In the same day, the Pope held a personal meeting with Members of the Jesuit Society at the Apostolic Nunciature to Indonesia. On September 5, the Pope held an interfaith meeting at Istiqlal Mosque and visited the Tunnel of Friendship. On the same occasion, he and the Grand Imam of Istiqlal Mosque, Nasaruddin Umar, signed a Joint Declaration of Istiqlal 2024, which highlights the role of religion in the humanitarian and environmental crises. In the afternoon, the Pope led a Holy Mass at Gelora Bung Karno Stadium which was reported to have been attended by 87,000 people. On September 6, Pope Francis left the country to Port Moresby, Papua New Guinea.

On 6 September, in the evening (Papua New Guinea time), Pope Francis made a visit to Papua New Guinea as a part of his tour of Southeast Asia and Oceania, spanning four nations. A number of noteworthy actions and events during the visit were made in an effort to support missionary activity, demonstrate support for the Catholic community, and address socioeconomic difficulties in the nation. On 8 September, Pope Francis celebrated Mass in Port Moresby, with over 35,000 attendees. He reassured them in his homily that, despite feeling distant from God, they are "at the center of His heart." After the Mass in Port Moresby, Pope Francis traveled to Vanimo, where he addressed over 20,000 Catholics, urging them to put aside rivalries and stop harmful behaviors like violence, infidelity, and substance abuse. In Vanimo, Pope Francis met with Argentine missionaries from the Institute of the Incarnate Word, praised their efforts, and encouraged the local community to support the church's work. The Pope emphasized the church's mission to support those marginalized by "prejudice and superstition," including women accused of witchcraft, urging the church to show "closeness, compassion, and tenderness" to society's most vulnerable. Pope Francis brought humanitarian aid, including medicine, clothing, and toys, to remote areas and pledged to support the construction of a new secondary school, reinforcing the Church's commitment to education and development. Overall, Pope Francis' visit to Papua New Guinea focused on strengthening the Catholic community, supporting missionary efforts, and addressing major social issues, leaving a lasting impact on the thousands who attended this historic event.

On 9 September, Pope Francis landed in Timor-Leste, marking the first papal visit to the country since its independence in 2002. Upon arriving at the Presidente Nicolau Lobato International Airport in Dili, Pope Francis was greeted by tens of thousands and met with Timorese President Jose Manuel Ramos-Horta and two young women dressed in traditional costumes, who offered him flowers and a tais, a woven ceremonial scarf, which the pontiff briefly wore. He would also meet with people, including Ramos-Horta, at the Presidential Palace. On September 10, Pope Francis visited the 'Irmãs ALMA' (Sisters of the Association of Lay Missionaries) School for Children with Disabilities in Dili. He also held a private mass with Catholic church clerical figures at Dili's Cathedral of Immaculate Conception and conferred with Jesuits at Dili's Apostolic Nunciature. The same day, an estimated 600,000 people, nearly half the country's population, attended a mass Pope Francis held at Esplanade of Tasitolu. Clerical sex abuse was a topic addressed during his visit to Timor-Leste. On 11 September 2024, Pope Francis held a meeting with young people in Dili before departing from East Timor.

On 11 September, Pope Francis arrived in Singapore. While the Changi International Airport, Pope Francis was welcomed in a small reception by Singapore's Minister of Culture, Community and Youth Edwin Tong, Tong's wife and a delegation of government and church officials such as Ambassador of Singapore to the Holy See Ang Janet Guat Har. He also received flowers from a group of children. After departing the airport, Pope Francis hold a meeting with some Jesuits at Saint Francis Xavier Retreat Centre. On September 12, 2024, Pope Francis visited that Singapore Parliament, where he received a welcome ceremony and met with both President Tharman Shanmugaratnam and Prime Minister and Minister for Finance Lawrence Wong. He also received a private meeting with Senior Minister Lee Hsien Loong in the afternoon and delivered a state address while speaking Italian at the National University of Singapore’s University Cultural Centre. He also held a mass, which attended by 50,000, at the country's National Stadium. On September 13, 2024 the pope met elderly and sick residents, as well as staff, of St. Theresa's Home and hold an interreligious meeting with young people at Singapore's Catholic Junior College before departing from the country and returning to Rome. Key themes of the pope's Singapore visit were interreligious dialogue, aging society, and education. In contrast to Pope John Paul II's 1986 visit to Singapore which lasted only five hours, Pope Francis stayed in the country for less than 48 hours.

- Luxembourg and Belgium (26–29 September)

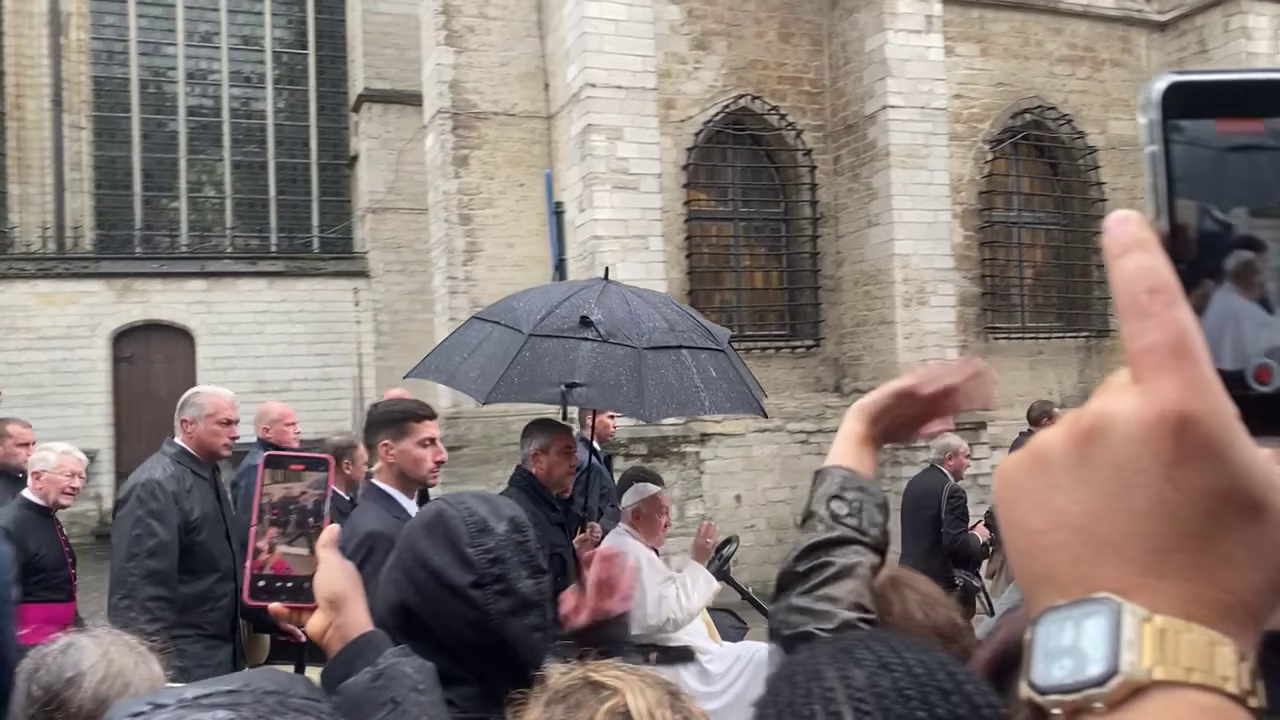
Pope Francis near Saint Peter's Church in Leuven, Belgium

On 26 September 2024, Pope Francis arrived in Luxembourg. He would stay in Luxembourg for less than a day. Upon arriving at Findel International Airport, the pope was greeted by Grand Duke Henri, his wife Grand Duchess Maria Teresa, Prime Minister Luc Frieden, Cardinal Jean-Claude Hollerich and a group of schoolchildren who had previously attendied the 2023 World Youth Day event. Before leaving the airport, the pope held a meeting with journalists. He then held a meeting with Henri and other local authorities at the Grand Ducal Palace. Following the meeting at the Grand Ducal Palace, the pope met with Prime Minister Frieden. While attending a gathering of local government authorities (including Prime Minister Frieden), members of the diplomatic corps and local representatives at Luxembourg City's Cercle Cité, Pope Francis urged Luxembourg to give more foreign aid to disadvantaged nations. The pope also invoked, among other things, the memories of World War II as an example of why the country should serve as a model for cooperation between nations, peace and unity. In a meeting with members of Luxembourg's Catholic community which was held at the city's Notre Dame Cathedral, Pope Francis called for the church to evolve, evangelize, and hold dialogue with other parts of the world. Following a private meeting with Grand Duke Henri, Grand Duchess Maria and Prime Minister Frieden at the Findel Airport's VIP Lounge, Pope Francis would depart from Luxembourg and begin his journey to Belgium.

- France (15 December)

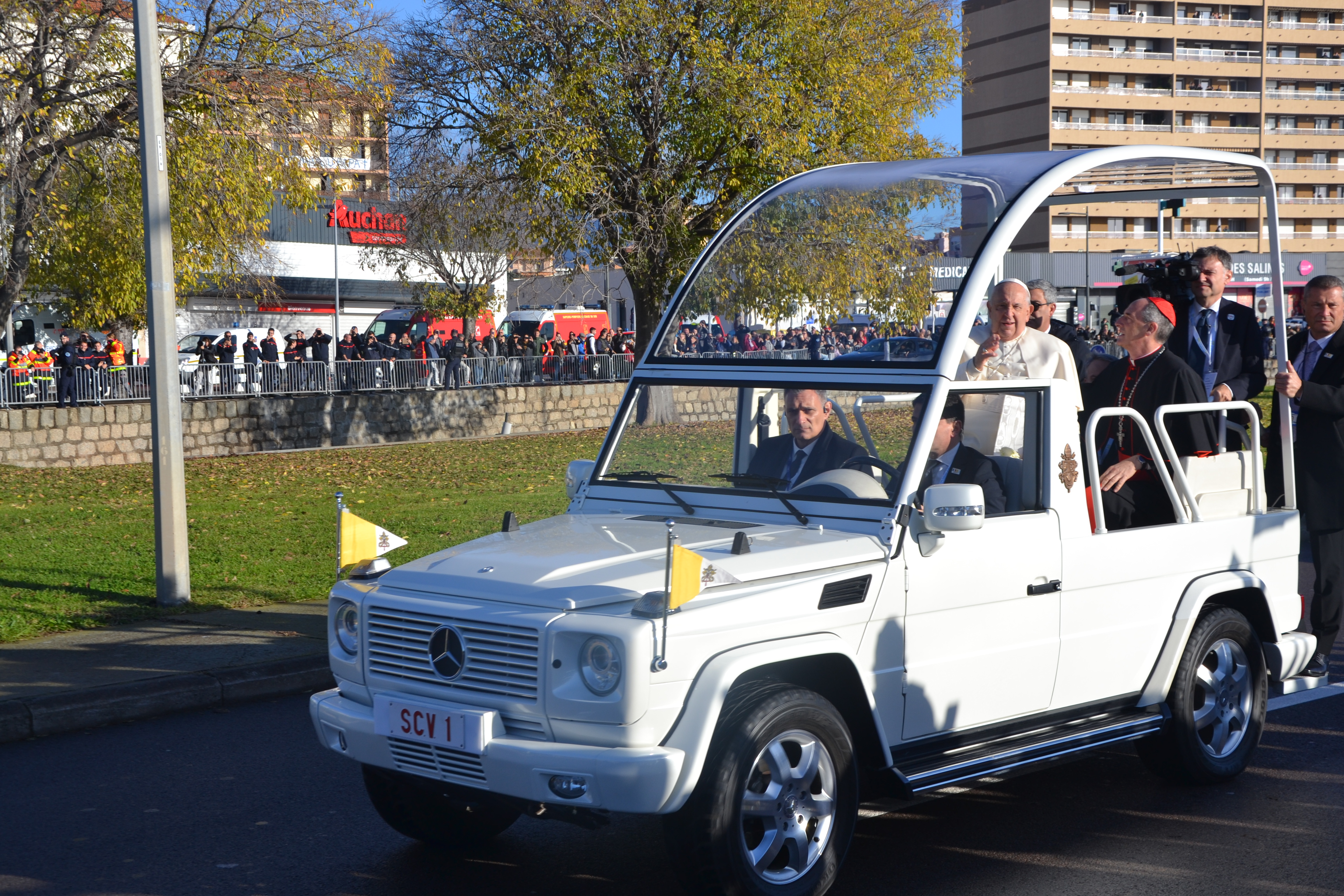
Visit of Pope Francis to Corsica

The Pope traveled to Corsica on 15 December 2024 for the closing of a conference on "popular religiosity in the Mediterranean" organized by Cardinal François-Xavier Bustillo and which many cardinals and bishops from the Mediterranean attended. This trip aroused controversy within the Catholic Church in France because the Pope declined an invitation to go to Paris on 8 December 2024 for the reopening of Notre-Dame cathedral. Pope Francis was the first pope to ever visit Corsica. Pope Francis would visit Corsica’s capital of Ajaccio. Upon his arrival at the local airport, pope was greeted by children in traditional garb and was continually serenaded by bands, choruses and singing troupes that are central to Corsican culture. He also visited the local convention center and Notre Dame of the Assumption cathedral, where he was joined on the dais by the bishop of Ajaccio, Cardinal François-Xavier Bustillo, who organized the conference that brought together some 400 participants from Spain, Sicily, Sardinia and southern France. While in Ajaccio, he also met with French President Emmanuel Macron, advising him to read a passage in his exhortation Gaudete et exsultate where he makes reference to St. Thomas More's prayer for a sense of humour.

== Visits within Italy ==
=== 2013 ===
- Lampedusa: 8 July

In his first travel as pope, Francis visited the tiny Italian island of Lampedusa, where he prayed for illegal migrants who drowned trying to reach Europe. He threw a wreath of flowers into the sea, in a sign of mourning – before presiding over an open-air Mass.

- Cagliari: 22 September

Pope Francis visited Sardinia's capital Cagliari to venerate the statue of Mary at the Sanctuary of Our Lady of Bonaria, which also bearsthe namesake of his native city of Buenos Aires

- Assisi: 4 October

=== 2014 ===
- Cassano all'Jonio: 21 June
- Campobasso and Isernia: 5 July
- Caserta: 26 July
- Redipuglia War Memorial: 13 September

On the occasion of the 100th anniversary of the outbreak of World War I.

=== 2015 ===
- Pompeii and Naples: 21 March
- Turin: 21 and 22 June
- Prato and Florence: 10 November

=== 2016 ===
- Assisi: 4 August
- Assisi: 20 September

=== 2017 ===
- Milan: 25 March
- Carpi and Mirandola: 2 April
- Genoa: 27 May
- Bozzolo and Barbiana: 20 June
- Cesena and Bologna: 1 October
- Nettuno: 2 November

While visiting Nettuno, Pope Francis would not only visit, but also hold a mass at the Sicily-Rome American Cemetery, which would coincide with All Souls Day. His visit to this cemetery would also mark the first official visit by a Pope to an overseas, American military cemetery. Upon his return to Rome, the pope would build on his visit to Nettuno by visiting the site of Ardeatine massacre.

=== 2018 ===
- Pietrelcina and San Giovanni Rotondo: 17 March

Francis visited sites associated with Padre Pio, also known as Saint Pio of Pietrelcina, on the 50th anniversary of his death.

- Alessano and Molfetta: 20 April

Francis marked the 25th anniversary of the death of Tonino Bello, Bishop of Molfetta from 1982 to 1993, with a visit to his tomb in the town of his birth, Alessano, and a Mass in Molfetta.

- Nomadelfia and Loppiano: 10 May

In Nomadelfia, near Grosseto, Francis met families who live communally and take in unwanted children in a fraternity founded in 1948 by Father Zeno Saltini. He handed over two children into their care. In Loppiano, he visited the original community of the Focolare Movement, where 850 people from 65 countries live together to demonstrate and promote international and intercultural understanding.

- Bari: 7 July
- Piazza Armerina and Palermo: 15 September

Making a day-long visit to Italy's southern island of Sicily, Pope Francis first stopped at the town of Piazza Armerina and then proceeded to the Sicilian capital Palermo, where he marked the 25th anniversary of the murder of Father Pino Puglisi at the hands of the local Mafia.

=== 2019 ===
- Loreto: 25 March– signed the post-Synodal apostolic exhortation Christus vivit.
- Camerino: 16 June– presided the Sunday Mass at the cathedral in Camerino, which was significantly damaged by an earthquake in 2016, and wore a firefighter safety helmet.
- Naples: 21 June– promoted inter-faith Catholic dialogue with Jews and Muslims.
- Albano Laziale: 21 September – held a Mass at the Cathedral of St. Pancras which referenced Zacchaeus, the tax collector of Jericho who is mentioned in the Gospel of Luke, as an example of why no one is lost in the eyes of the church.
- Greccio: 1 December

=== 2020 ===
- Bari: 23 February

=== 2022 ===
- L'Aquila: 28 August

=== 2024 ===
- Venice: 28 April: Pope Francis attended the Venice Biennale, this was the first papal visit to the international exhibition.
- Verona: 18 May.
- Fasano: 14 June: The Pope participated in the 50th G7 summit in which he joined a session devoted to artificial intelligence and held bilateral talks with several world leaders. This was the first time a Pope participated in a G7 summit.
- Trieste: 7 July

== See also ==
- List of pastoral visits of Pope Paul VI
- List of pastoral visits of Pope John Paul II
- List of pastoral visits of Pope Benedict XVI
- List of pastoral visits of Pope Leo XIV
- List of meetings between the pope and the president of the United States
- Papal travel
- State visit
