= 2008 visit by Pope Benedict XVI to the United States =

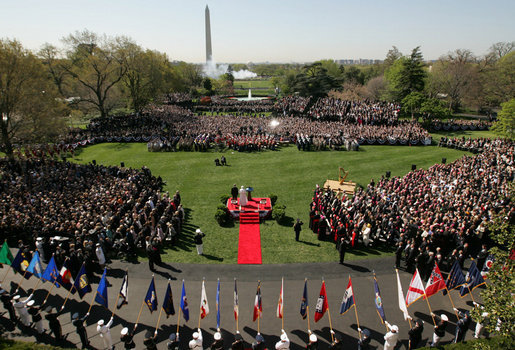
The ceremony on the South Lawn of the White House at which the Pope was formally received.

Pope Benedict XVI's visit to the United States took place from April 15, 2008, to April 20, 2008. It was his only visit to the United States. It was officially titled the "Apostolic Visit to the United States of America and to the Seat of the United Nations". It was the sixth official papal visit to the United States since the U.S. established full diplomatic relations with the Holy See in 1984. In addition to his 1979 visit, Pope John Paul II visited the United States in 1987, 1993, 1995, and 1999. Pope Francis visited the United States in 2015.

The Pope's visit included meetings with President George W. Bush, an address to the United Nations General Assembly in New York City, a visit to Ground Zero, and Masses at Nationals Park in Washington, D.C., and Yankee Stadium in New York City, among other activities.

== Preparation ==
The visit was announced on November 12, 2007 by Archbishop Pietro Sambi to the U.S. Conference of Catholic Bishops. The announcement confirmed that the visit would take place from April 15-20, 2008, and include stops in Washington, D.C., and New York City.

Preparatory work included the coordination between the Catholic Church and local authorities, and arrangements for large public Masses. Archbishop Sambi played the central role in coordinating preparations, acting as the liaison between the Vatican, the U.S. bishops, and governmental authorities.

== Visit ==
=== April 15 (Washington) ===
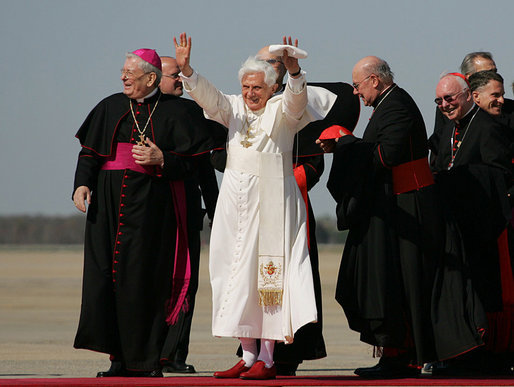
Pope Benedict arrives at Andrews Air Force Base

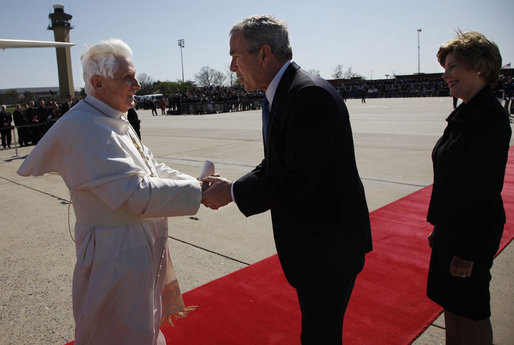
President Bush greets Pope Benedict XVI at Andrews Air Force Base

The Pope arrived at Andrews Air Force Base outside Washington on April 15, 2008, greeted by President Bush and cheering crowds. This was the first time any president had gone to the base to greet a foreign dignitary, as presidents customarily wait for visitors at the White House.

=== April 16 (Washington) ===
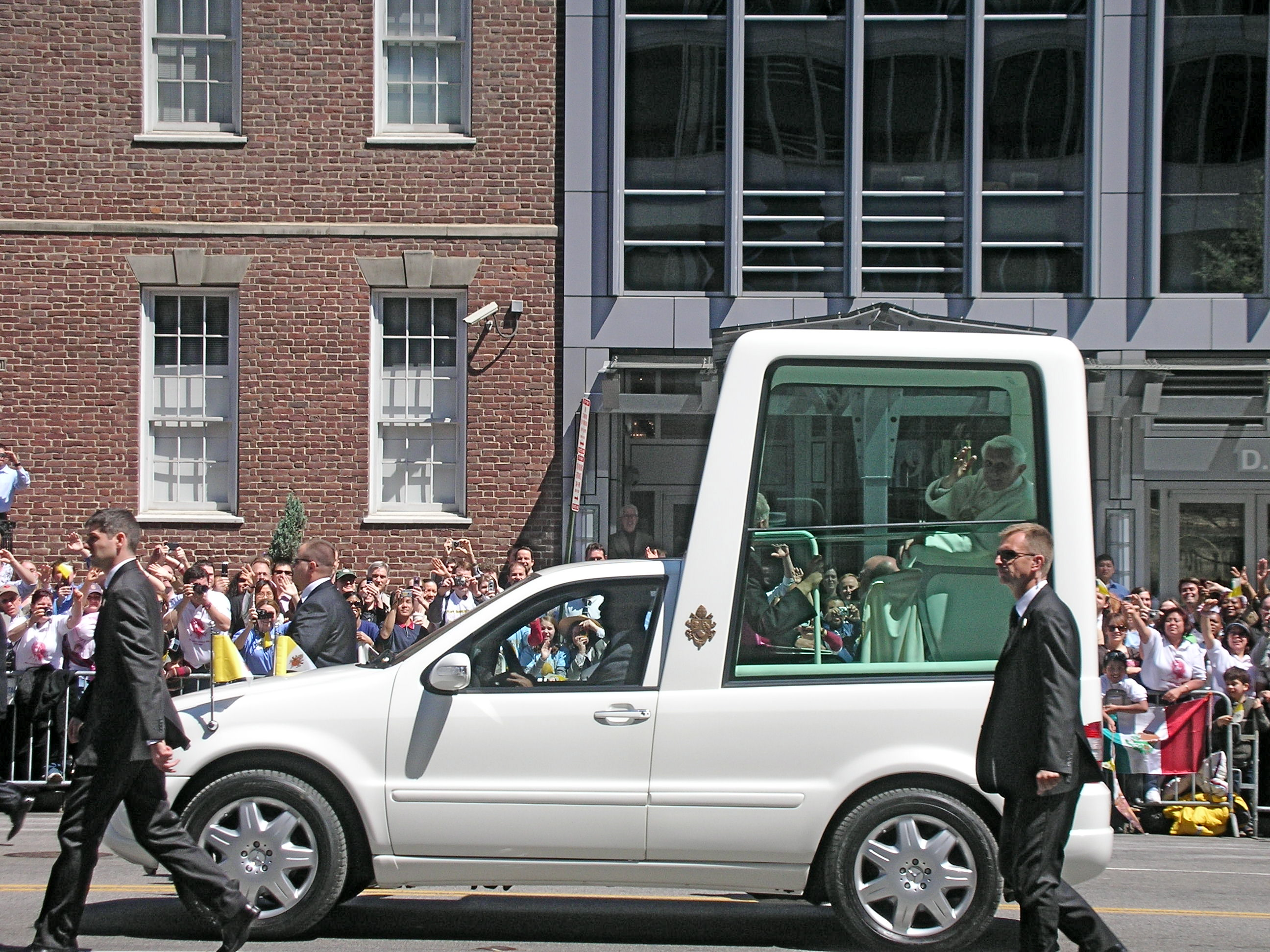
Pope Benedict waves to the crowd on Pennsylvania Avenue in Washington, D.C.

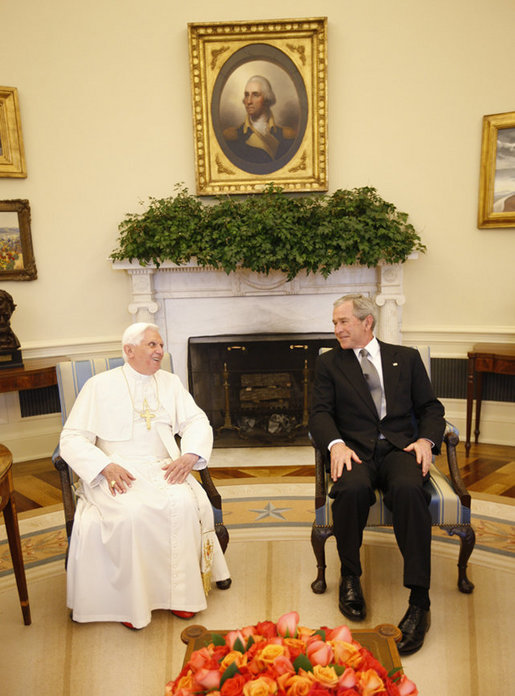
Pope Benedict meets with George W. Bush in the Oval Office.

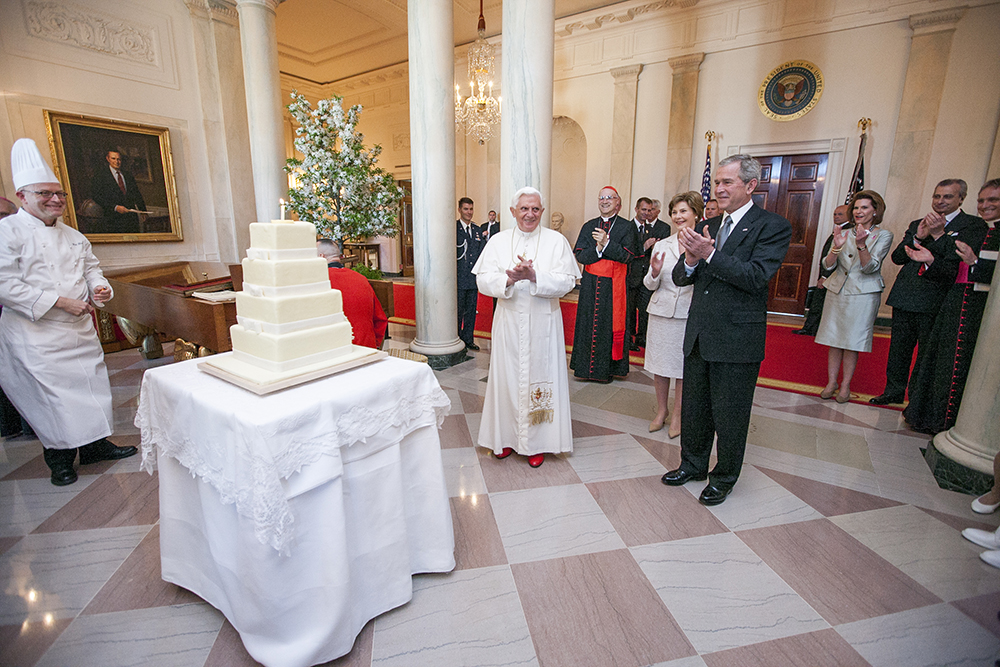
Pope Benedict XVI celebrates his 81st birthday with President George W. Bush and First Lady Laura Bush, April 16, 2008

The Pope was formally received at the White House on April 16. Over 9,000 people gathered on the South Lawn of the White House, including thousands of members of the public who got free tickets in a lottery-type drawing, and another 4,000 without tickets to the ceremony lined the streets around the White House to see his motorcade. The crowd sang "Happy Birthday" to the Pope, who turned 81 years old that day. The Pope addressed the crowd in English, saying he had "great respect for this vast pluralistic society" and ended by saying "God bless America". In his speech, Bush said the visit was a reminder to Americans to "distinguish between simple right and wrong", saying, "We need your message to reject this dictatorship of relativism and embrace a culture of justice and truth." He told the Pope that in America, "you'll find a nation that welcomes the role of religion in the public square...[I]n a world where some evoke the name of God to justify acts of terror and murder and hate, we need your message that God is love. And embracing this love is the surest way to save man from falling prey to the teaching of fanaticism and terrorism." After the ceremony, Bush and the Pope met in the Oval Office, where Bush presented him with a birthday cake.

During their private meeting in the Oval Office, the Pope expressed his concerns to Bush about the Iraq War and illegal immigration in the country.

Afterwards, the Pope went to the Basilica of the National Shrine of the Immaculate Conception, where he addressed American bishops. Bush hosted a state dinner at the White House later that evening for visiting cardinals, bishops and various dignitaries.

=== April 17 (Washington) ===
The Pope celebrated Mass at the newly built Nationals Park in Washington, home to the Washington Nationals Major League Baseball team. 46,000 people attended the Mass at the stadium, which has an official seating capacity of about 41,000. 200,000 requests for tickets, which were free, had been submitted prior to the mass. Those in attendance included 14 cardinals, 250 bishops, and 1,300 priests. The altar was set up in the outfield and live video of the Mass was shown on the scoreboard. In his homily, the Pope urged American Catholics to "foster healing and reconciliation" in the wake of the child sex abuse scandal.

After the Mass, he went to the Catholic University of America to address representatives from American Catholic universities, diocesan schools, and others about the role of the Church in education. After that, he went to the university's Pope John Paul II Cultural Center to meet privately with about 200 representatives of Judaism, Islam, Jainism, Buddhism, and Hinduism to promote interfaith dialogue.

=== April 18 (New York) ===
The Pope addressed the United Nations General Assembly at the UN Headquarters in New York. He praised the UN as a defender of human rights, but cautioned that it must be acknowledged that human rights come from God.

He made a historic visit to a Jewish synagogue in New York, the first visit by any Pope to a Jewish place of worship in America. The visit fell on the eve of Passover. He said he found it "moving to recall that Jesus as a young boy heard the words of Scripture and prayed in a place such as this."

=== April 19 (New York) ===
The Pope visited St. Patrick's Cathedral, where he celebrated Mass. In his homily, he spoke of the child sex abuse scandal and called for healing.

He met with disabled children and their families then led a youth rally of over 20,000 teenagers and young adults at St. Joseph's Seminary in Yonkers, New York.

=== April 20 (New York) ===
The Pope visited Ground Zero, the site of the World Trade Center towers which were destroyed in the September 11, 2001 attacks. He prayed for the victims of the 9/11 attacks and met with a small group of relatives of the victims as well as a handful of first responders and survivors. He blessed the site, lit a candle, and gave a prayer for the dead. He prayed for "eternal light and peace" for those killed and for healing for their families.

The Pope said Mass to a crowd of nearly 60,000 at Yankee Stadium, home of the New York Yankees. Over 200,000 had requested tickets, which were free, for the event. The New York Times said the crowd "roared with all the sustained excitement of spectators at a pennant-clinching game." The altar was set up on second base. In his homily, he said the unwavering truth of the Catholic Church's message guarantees respect for the dignity of all human life, "including the most defenseless of all human beings, the unborn child in the mother's womb." The Mass marked the third time a Pope had visited the stadium, a record for any venue in the United States. (Pope Paul VI celebrated Mass at the stadium in 1965, and Pope John Paul II celebrated Mass there in 1979.) MLB changed the Yankees schedule to accommodate the Mass, resulting in the Yankees playing 18 of their 20 games in April on the road, the most in one month in MLB history.

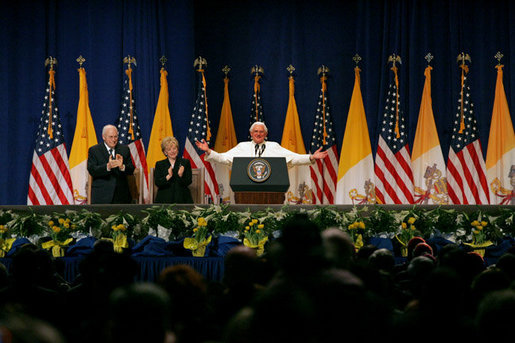
The Pope speaks at the farewell ceremony hosted by Vice President Cheney.

Vice President Dick Cheney hosted a farewell ceremony for the Pope at John F. Kennedy International Airport attended by 3,000 people. After a final speech, he boarded a specially chartered Alitalia plane with the callsign "Shepherd One" and touched down at Rome's Ciampino International Airport at 10:40 AM local time.

== See also ==
- List of journeys of Pope Benedict XVI
- Catholic Church in the United States
