= List of meetings between the pope and the president of the United States =

This is the list of meetings between the pope and the president of the United States. The first meeting between a pope and an incumbent U.S. president took place in the aftermath of World War I, January 1919, at the Vatican between Benedict XV and Woodrow Wilson. Altogether, there have been 32 meetings between six popes and 14 U.S. presidents over the past century.

== Meetings ==
Key

Meeting occurred in present-day Vatican City
Meeting occurred in the United States
Meeting occurred in present-day Italy

No.	Date	Site	City	Country	President	Pope	Notes
1	January 4, 1919	Apostolic Palace	Rome	Italy	Woodrow Wilson	Benedict XV	First meeting between the incumbent president of the United States and the reigning pope. Occurred during President Wilson's participation in the Paris Peace Conference, the first visit by a sitting U.S. president to Europe.
2	December 6, 1959	Vatican City			Dwight D. Eisenhower	John XXIII	
3	July 2, 1963	Vatican City			John F. Kennedy	Paul VI	First meeting between a Roman Catholic U.S. president and the head of the Catholic Church.
4	October 4, 1965	Waldorf Astoria New York	New York City	United States	Lyndon B. Johnson	Paul VI	Further information: 1965 visit by Pope Paul VI to the United States
5	December 23, 1967	Vatican City			Lyndon B. Johnson	Paul VI	Unannounced stop at the end of the president's visit to Australia and Asia.
6	March 2, 1969	Vatican City			Richard Nixon	Paul VI	
7	September 29, 1970	Vatican City			Richard Nixon	Paul VI	
8	June 3, 1975	Vatican City			Gerald Ford	Paul VI	
9	October 6, 1979	White House	Washington, D.C.	United States	Jimmy Carter	John Paul II	First visit by a pope to the White House.
10	June 21, 1980	Vatican City			Jimmy Carter	John Paul II	
11	June 7, 1982	Vatican City			Ronald Reagan	John Paul II	
12	May 2, 1984	Fairbanks International Airport	Fairbanks, Alaska	United States	Ronald Reagan	John Paul II	President Reagan was returning to the United States from a visit to China while Pope John Paul II was making a stopover on his way to South Korea, Papua New Guinea, the Solomon Islands, and Thailand.
13	June 6, 1987	Vatican City			Ronald Reagan	John Paul II	
14	September 10, 1987	Miami International Airport and the Vizcaya Museum and Gardens	Miami, Florida	United States	Ronald Reagan	John Paul II	
15	May 27, 1989	Vatican City			George H. W. Bush	John Paul II	
16	November 8, 1991	Vatican City			George H. W. Bush	John Paul II	
17	August 12, 1993	Regis University	Denver, Colorado	United States	Bill Clinton	John Paul II	Both leaders addressed thousands of young students at World Youth Day.
18	June 2, 1994	Vatican City			Bill Clinton	John Paul II	
19	October 4, 1995	Newark Liberty International Airport	Newark, New Jersey	United States	Bill Clinton	John Paul II	
20	January 26, 1999	St. Louis Lambert International Airport	St. Louis, Missouri	United States	Bill Clinton	John Paul II	
21	July 23, 2001	Palace of Castel Gandolfo (Note: Pursuant to the Lateran Treaty of 1929, the Papal Palace of Castel Gandolfo is Italian territory, but owned by the Holy See and equipped with extraterritoriality comparable to that of diplomatic missions.)	Castel Gandolfo	Italy	George W. Bush	John Paul II	
22	May 28, 2002	Vatican City			George W. Bush	John Paul II	
23	June 4, 2004	Vatican City			George W. Bush	John Paul II	President Bush presented Pope John Paul II with the Presidential Medal of Freedom.
24	June 9, 2007	Vatican City			George W. Bush	Benedict XVI	
25	April 15–16, 2008	White House	Washington, D.C.	United States	George W. Bush	Benedict XVI	Further information: 2008 visit by Pope Benedict XVI to the United States
26	June 13, 2008	Vatican City			George W. Bush	Benedict XVI	
27	July 10, 2009	Vatican City			Barack Obama	Benedict XVI	
28	March 27, 2014	Vatican City			Barack Obama	Francis	
29	September 22–23, 2015	White House	Washington, D.C.	United States	Barack Obama	Francis	Further information: 2015 visit by Pope Francis to North America
30	May 24, 2017	Vatican City			Donald Trump	Francis	Occurred during President Trump's visit to Israel, the West Bank, Italy, and Saudi Arabia. The meeting proceeded amicably despite prior public disagreements between the two on environmental policy and Trump's proposed U.S.-Mexico border wall.
31	October 29, 2021	Vatican City			Joe Biden	Francis	Meeting between a Roman Catholic U.S. president and the head of the Catholic Church. Occurred during President Biden's visit to Italy and the United Kingdom.
32	June 14, 2024	Borgo Egnazia	Fasano	Italy	Joe Biden	Francis	President Biden and Pope Francis participated in the 50th G7 summit and later held a bilateral meeting.

== Gallery ==
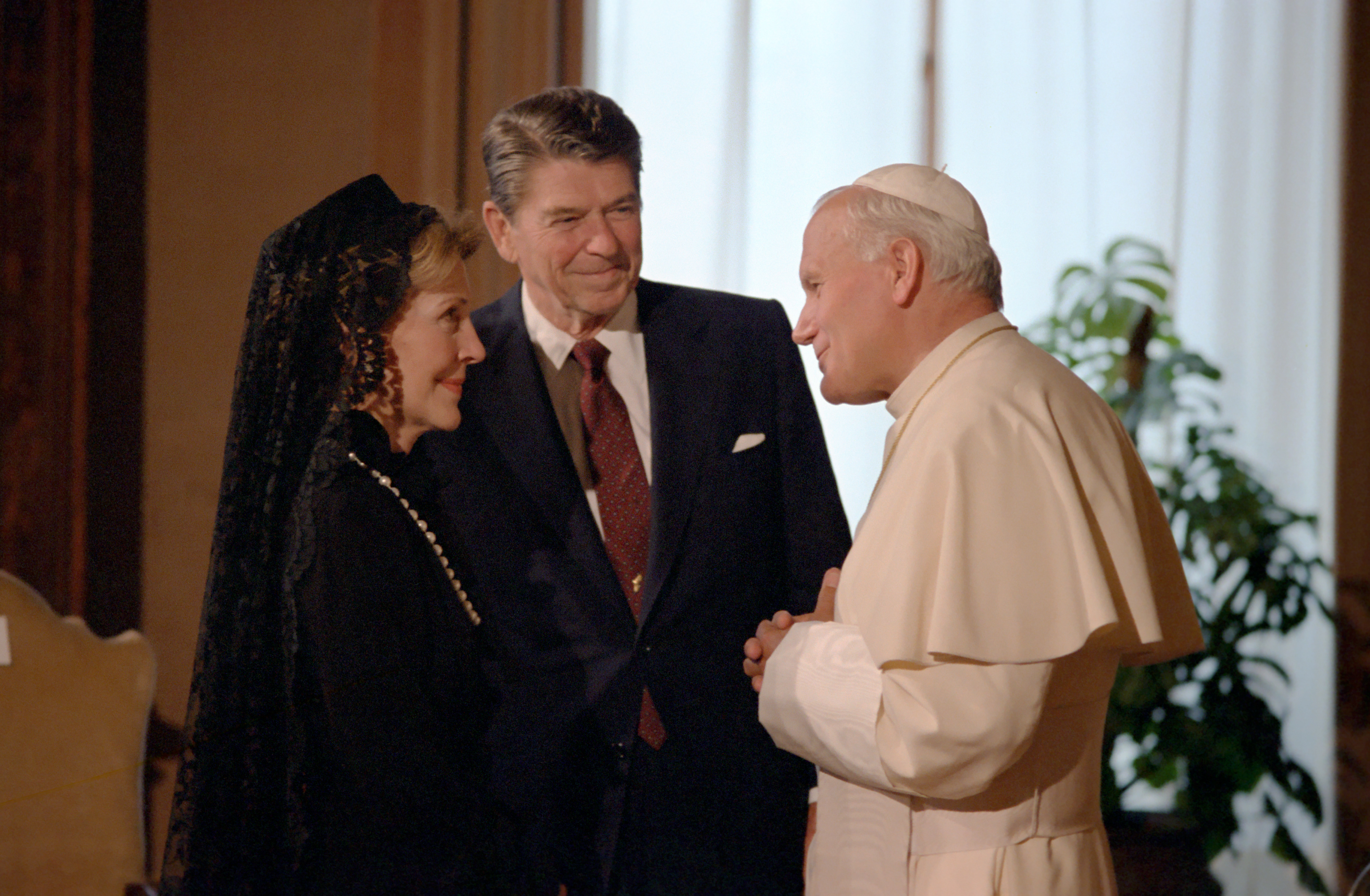
President Ronald Reagan and First Lady Nancy Reagan with Pope John Paul II, June 7, 1982

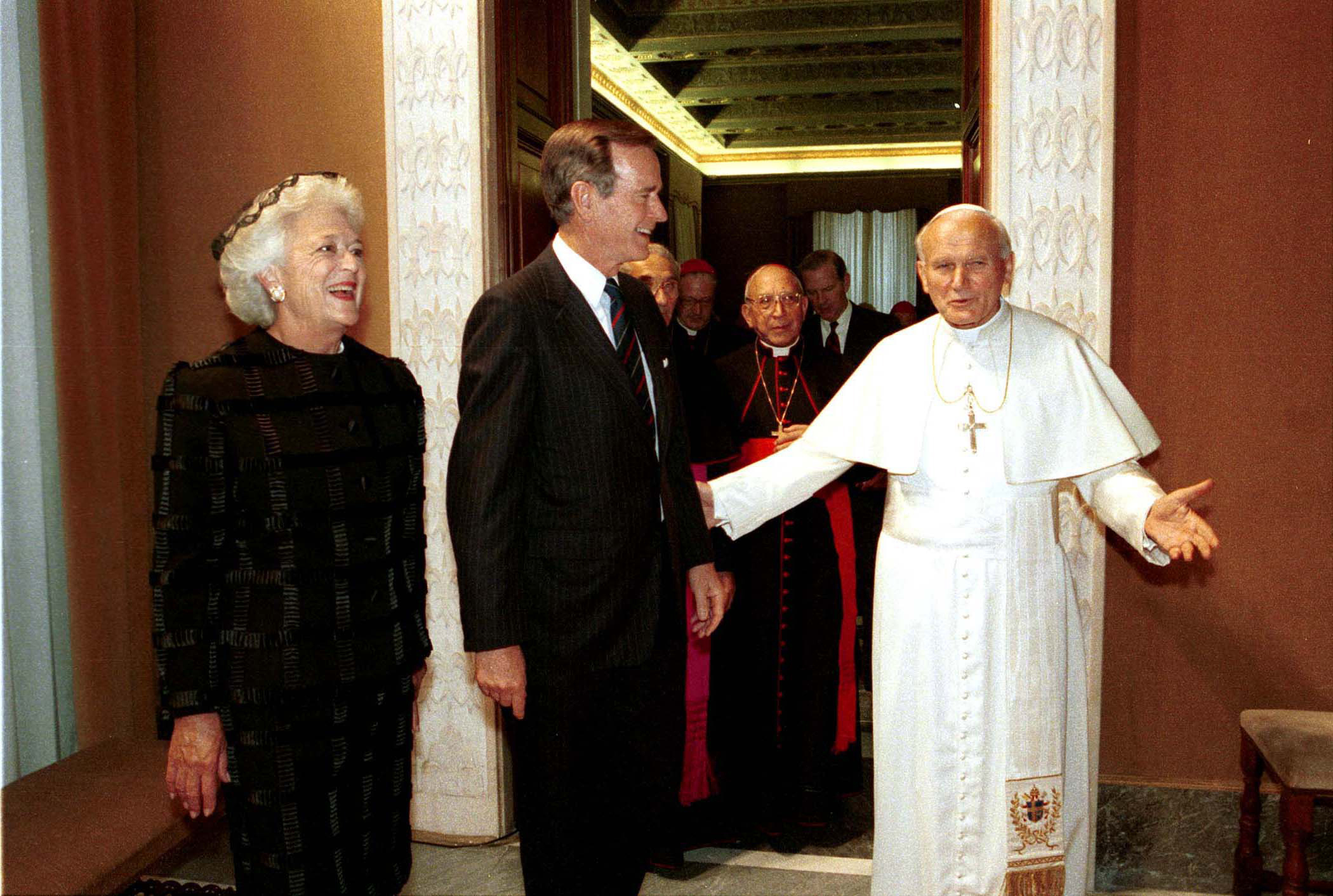
President George H. W. Bush and First Lady Barbara Bush with Pope John Paul II, May 27, 1989

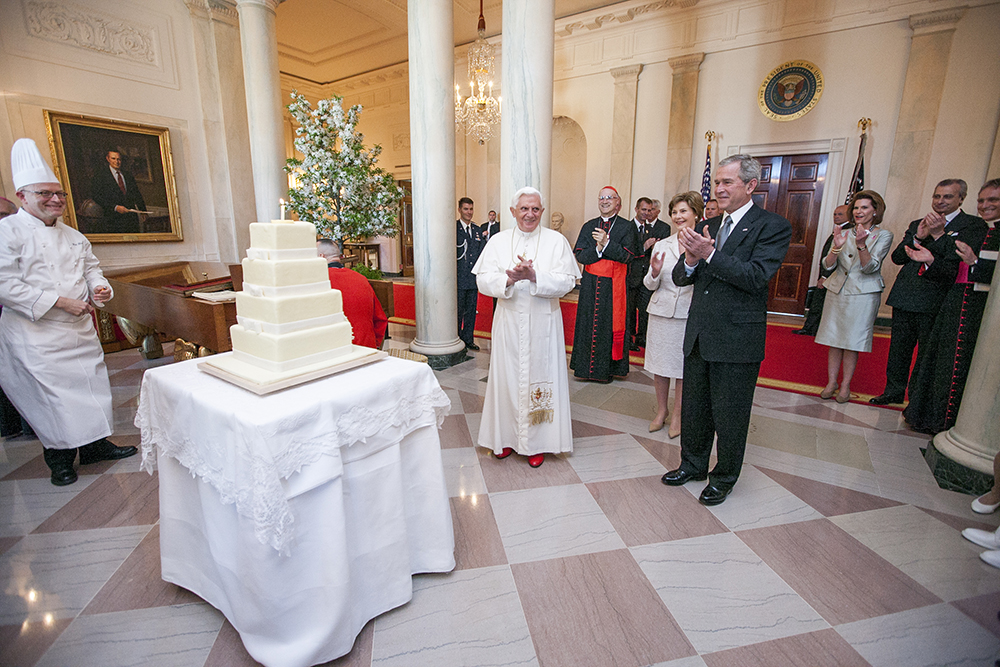
Pope Benedict XVI celebrates his 81st birthday with President George W. Bush and First Lady Laura Bush, April 16, 2008

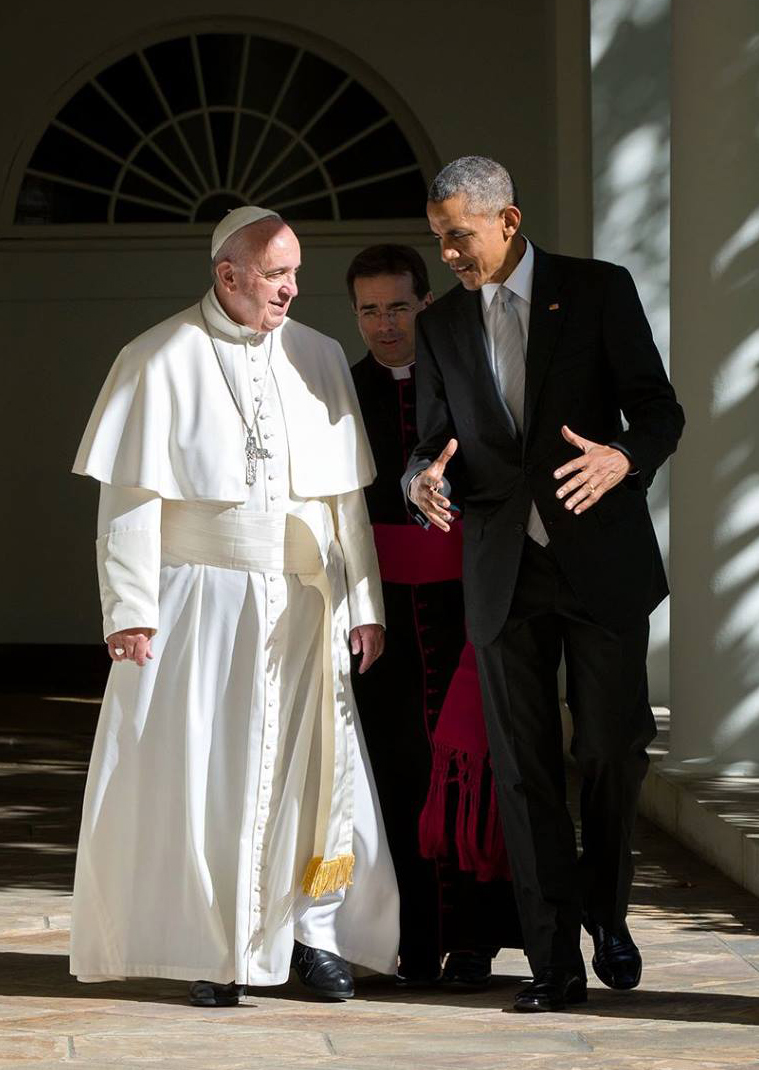
Pope Francis and President Barack Obama at the White House, September 23, 2015

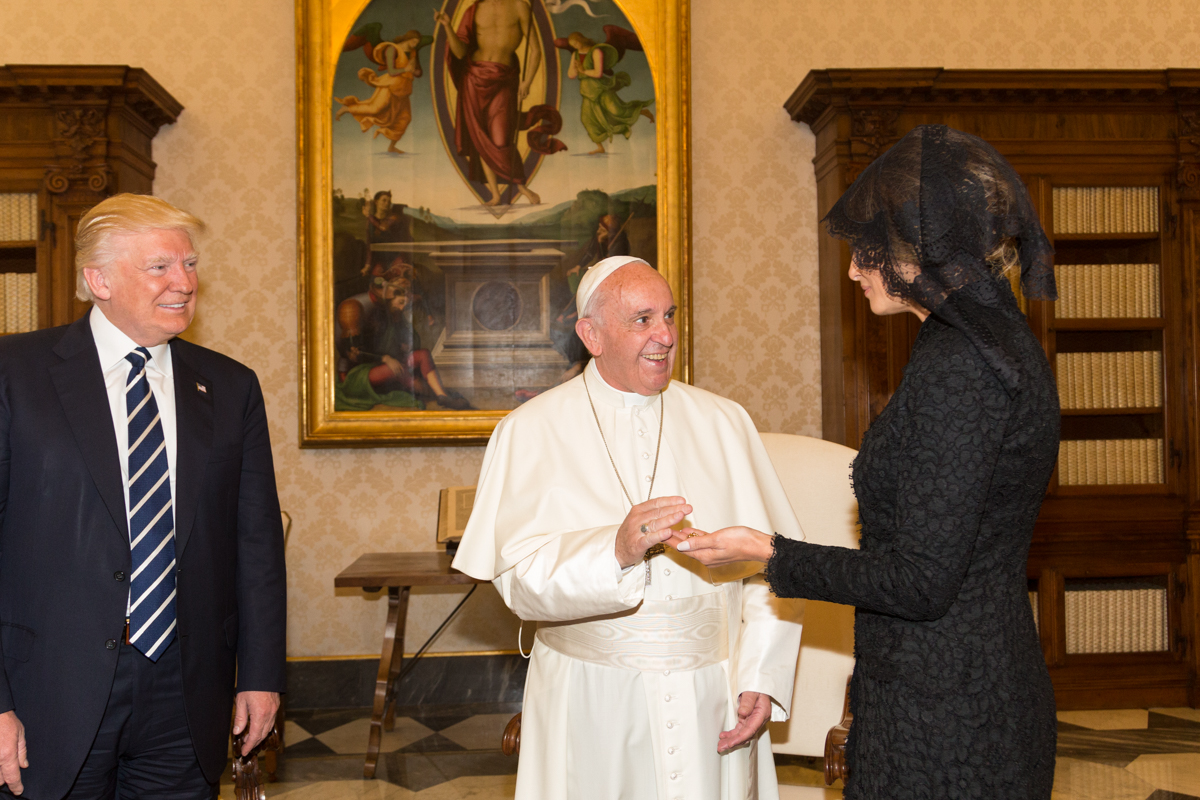
President Donald Trump and First Lady Melania Trump with Pope Francis, May 24, 2017

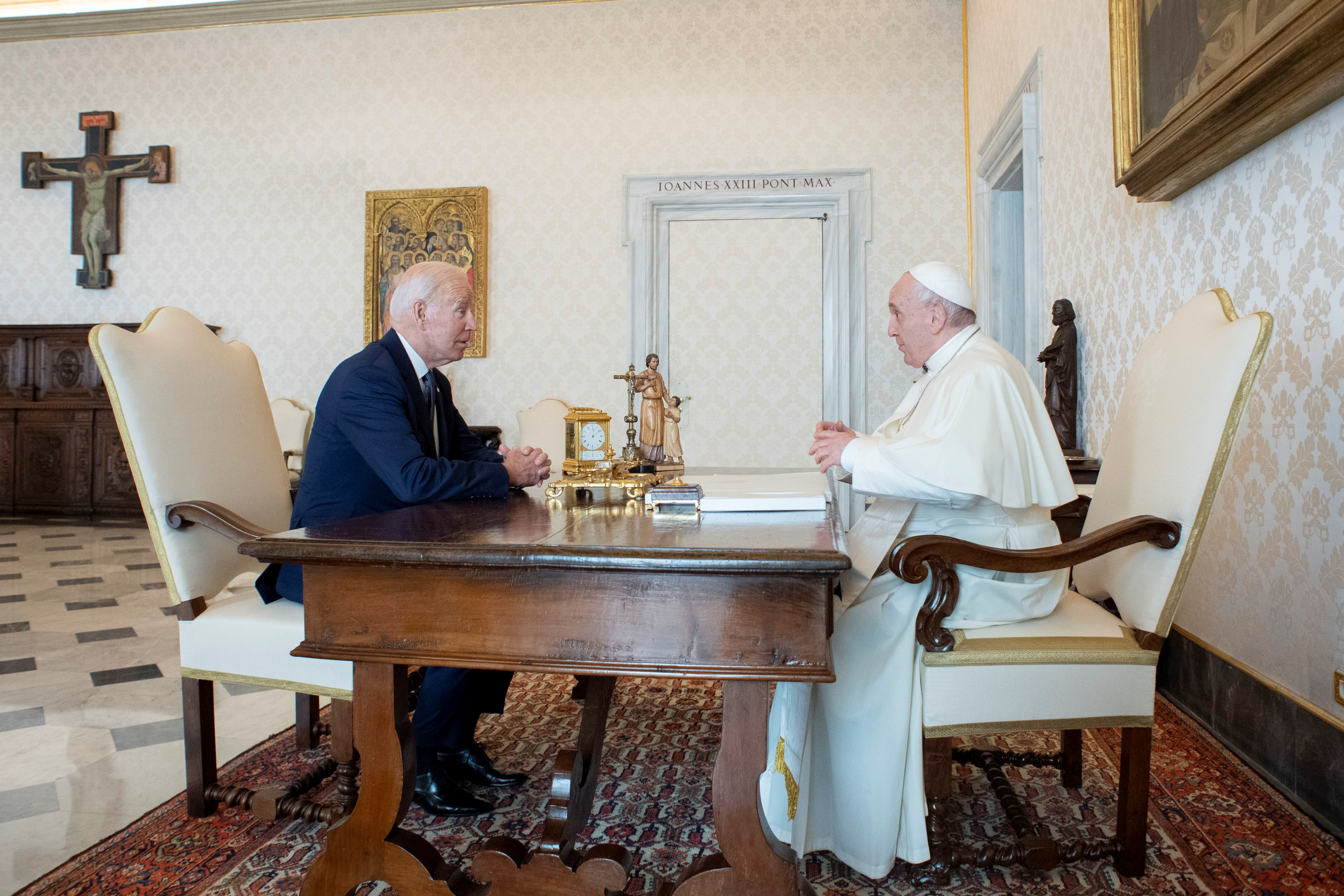
President Joe Biden with Pope Francis, October 29, 2021

== Other meetings ==
=== Future popes meeting the president ===
Eugenio Pacelli (later Pope Pius XII) visited the United States for two weeks in October–November 1936 and met President Franklin D. Roosevelt at Hyde Park, New York on November 5, 1936.

President George W. Bush attended the funeral of Pope John Paul II on April 8, 2005 and briefly met Cardinal Joseph Ratzinger, later Pope Benedict XVI, who had celebrated the Requiem Mass. Bush was the first incumbent U.S. president to attend a papal funeral.

=== Future presidents meeting the pope ===
According to his sister Corinne, future President Theodore Roosevelt, aged 11, met Pope Pius IX in Rome and kissed his hand when the Roosevelt family was travelling in Europe.

In 1902, future U.S. President William Howard Taft, in his capacity as Governor-General of the Philippines, met in the Vatican with Pope Leo XIII to conduct negotiations concerning the purchase of lands owned by Catholic religious orders in the Philippines after the United States gained control of the Catholic-dominated islands at the conclusion of the Spanish-American War. The goal was that the United States acquire these lands then sell them to Filipino farmers to give them a stake in the new government and address resentment against the mostly Spanish priests who held much of the arable land. The Pope promised to study the issue and expressed support for the American pacification program, which was agreed to and implemented by 1904.

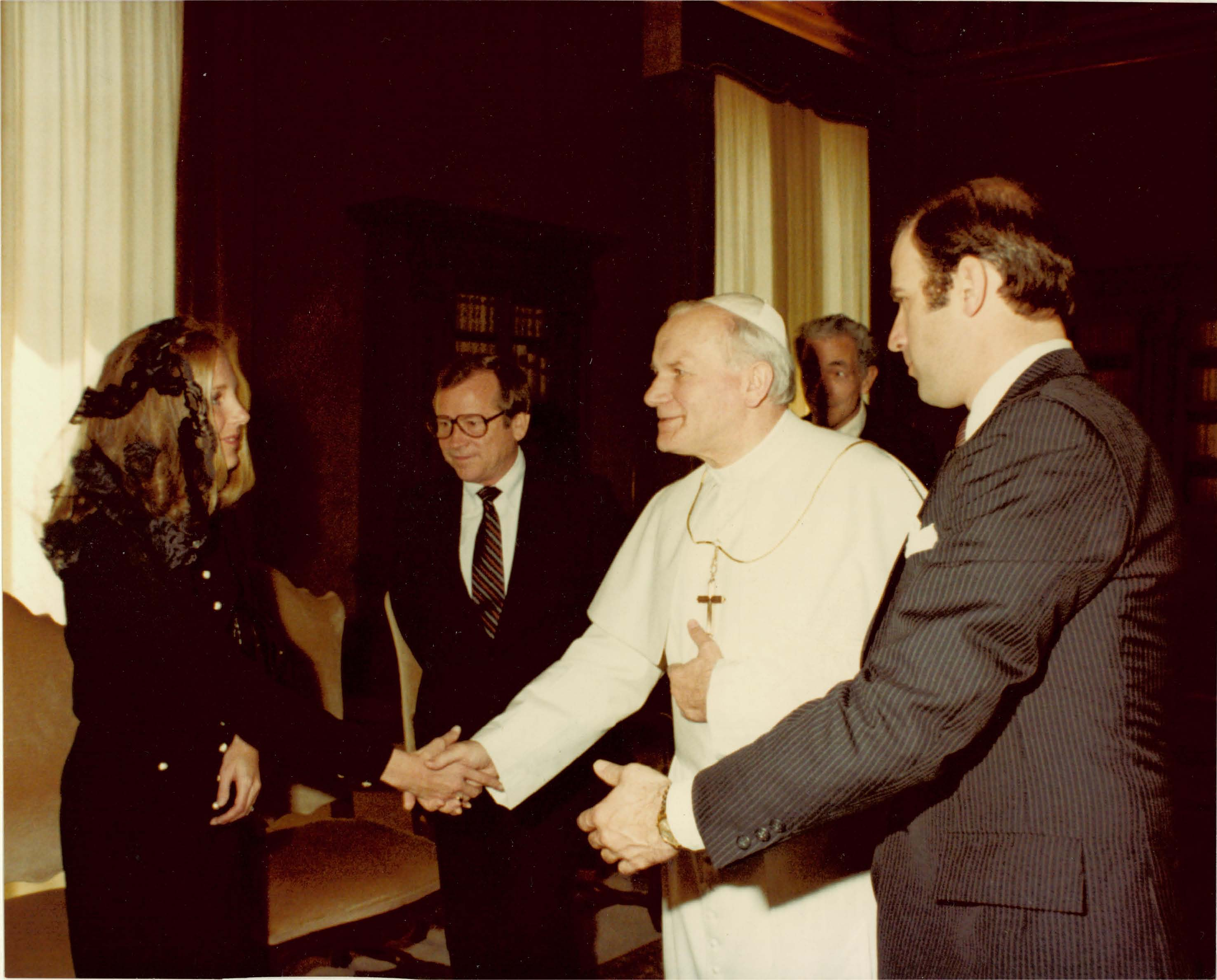
Pope John Paul II with Joe and Jill Biden on April 12, 1980.

While Joe Biden was serving as a U.S. Senator, he met with Pope John Paul II on April 12, 1980 at the Vatican. During Biden's tenure as Vice President of the United States, he met Pope Francis on three occasions. Biden led the U.S. delegation at the papal inauguration of Pope Francis in March 2013; he accompanied the pope during the pontiff's visit to the United States in September 2015; and met him at a Vatican conference on cancer research in April 2016.

Then-Vice President George H. W. Bush met Pope John Paul II on September 19, 1987 in Detroit. The pope was concluding a ten-day visit to the United States.

=== First ladies meeting the pope ===
Jacqueline Kennedy was the first First Lady of the United States to meet with a pope independent of her husband, the president. On March 11, 1962, she met with Pope John XXIII at the Vatican while en route to India and Pakistan.

Nancy Reagan met Pope John Paul II at the Vatican on May 4, 1985 while President Ronald Reagan was attending the 11th G7 summit in Bonn, West Germany. Mrs. Reagan met the pontiff again on September 16, 1987 in Los Angeles during his ten-day visit to the United States.

Laura Bush and her daughter Barbara Bush met Pope Benedict XVI at the Vatican on February 9, 2006. The First Lady was en route to the 2006 Winter Olympics in Turin.

=== Former presidents meeting the pope ===
After leaving office, former Presidents Martin Van Buren and Millard Fillmore met separately with Pope Pius IX in Rome in 1855. Pius IX also met Franklin Pierce in November 1857. In 1878, Ulysses S. Grant met Pope Leo XIII in the Vatican as part of his post-presidential world tour.

In April 1910, Theodore Roosevelt sought an audience with Pope Pius X. The Pope agreed to see him, provided Roosevelt would not call on some Methodist missionaries in Rome. Roosevelt had no intention of meeting the missionaries, but he declined to submit to Pius X's conditions and the interview did not take place. Theodore Roosevelt called the entire papal episode, "An elegant row."

In July 2023, Bill Clinton visited Pope Francis at Casa di Santa Marta in Vatican City. They had a private meeting to talk about peace.

== See also ==
- Holy See–United States relations
- List of international trips made by presidents of the United States
- List of pastoral trips made by Pope Paul VI
- List of pastoral trips made by Pope John Paul II
- List of pastoral trips made by Pope Benedict XVI
- List of pastoral trips made by Pope Francis
- List of pastoral trips made by Pope Leo XIV
- Papal travel
- Papal visits to the United States
