= 1965 visit by Pope Paul VI to the United States =

First papal visit to the Americas

- Part of pastoral visits of Pope Paul VI
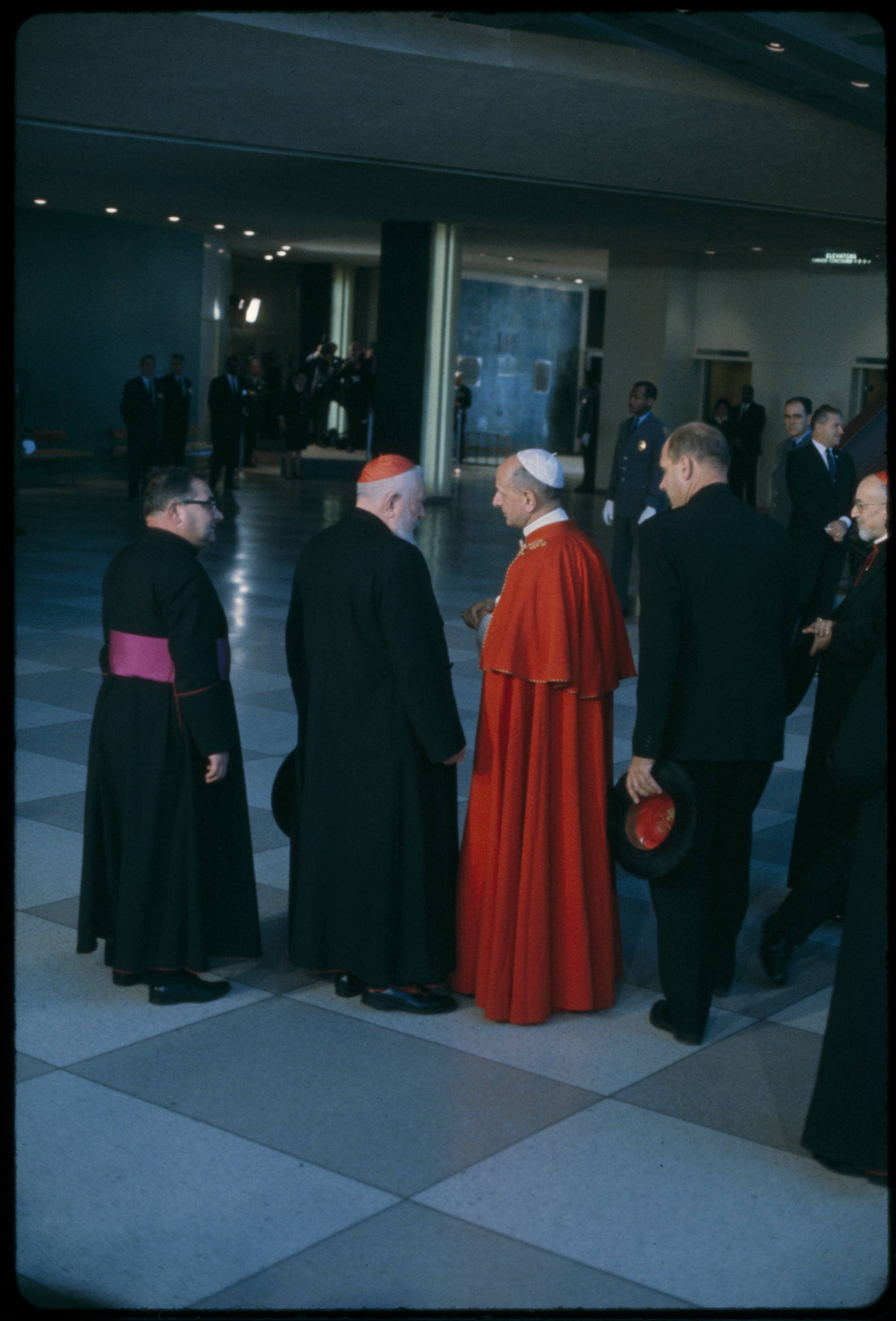
- Pope Paul VI (in red) at the headquarters of the United Nations in New York City
- Date: October 4, 1965
- Location: New York City, New York, United States; 40°44′58″N 73°58′5″W
- Cause: To give a speech before the United Nations General Assembly
- Filmed by: ABC, CBS, and NBC

Pope Paul VI visited New York City on October 4, 1965. This was the first time that a pope had visited the United States in particular and the Americas as a whole.

The purpose of the trip was for Paul VI to give a speech before the United Nations General Assembly regarding world peace. In addition to his speech at the UN's headquarters, the pope held a Mass service at Yankee Stadium, blessed Cardinal Francis Spellman at St. Patrick's Cathedral, spoke with President Lyndon B. Johnson at the Waldorf Astoria New York, and visited the Vatican City's pavilion at the 1964 New York World's Fair. It is estimated that at least 1 million people saw the pope in person, while 100 million watched his visit on television. After the visit, a shrine was erected at the site of the pavilion honoring the pope.

== Background ==
=== Purpose ===
The primary purpose of Pope Paul VI's trip to New York City was to speak before the United Nations regarding peace, especially with regard to a recent conflict between India and Pakistan. In light of this, the pope selected October 4, 1965, as the date for his visit. The date was the feast day for Francis of Assisi, the namesake of the American city of San Francisco, which had been the birthplace of the United Nations. The trip would follow several others that the pope had taken prior, including to the Holy Land and to India, with Newsweek opining in contemporary reporting that "Paul VI is clearly seeking for the Vatican the same kind of recognition and broader audience that secular leaders seek with their own state visits". The magazine also stated that the trips were part of a broader mission, initiated by Paul VI's predecessor Pope John XXIII, to increase the church's engagement with the secular world. To that end, Paul VI was the first pope to travel outside of Italy since 1809.

=== Preparations ===
According to Time, Paul VI's visit was difficult for officials in the federal government to plan because the United States did not have any diplomatic relations with the Vatican City at the time, meaning that President Lyndon B. Johnson could not meet with the pope as he would a visiting head of state. However, as Johnson was already planning to be in New York City during that day for meetings, it was decided that the two could meet in an unofficial capacity.

The New York City Police Department prepared for the pope's visit by stationing 18,000 officers along his planned route through the city, at a cost of $1 million ($10 million in 2025) in overtime pay. Additional security support was provided by the New York State Police, the United States Secret Service, Pinkerton, and members of the United States Department of State and the United Nations' security forces. Buildings along the route were checked by security teams, with multiple shops along the route opting to board up their windows and close for the day. Specific areas for protestors were established and patrolled, with special attention paid to people expressing strong anti-Catholic sentiments. In addition to ground forces, several police helicopters were in the air during his tour and several frogmen were stationed under bridges.

A week prior to his arrival, a 21-foot (6.4 m) Lincoln Continental limousine was customized to serve as a popemobile. The vehicle featured a large open section in the rear with a black vinyl throne that could be raised or lowered electronically, with lighting to illuminate the pope for spectators to see. Television and radio crews were set up along the route, with the Big Three television networks—ABC, CBS, and NBC—pooling their resources for the coverage. To provide commentary for their coverage, CBS employed Fulton J. Sheen, who at the time was a Catholic bishop.

== Visit ==
Paul VI arrived in New York City on October 4, 1965. He traveled via Alitalia, flying in a Douglas DC-8 that had been decorated with chartreuse velvet. Upon landing at John F. Kennedy International Airport, he was greeted by U Thant, the secretary-general of the United Nations, and spoke to television reporters. While at the airport, he proclaimed:

"Greetings to you, America. The first pope to set foot on your land blesses you with all his heart. He renews, as it were, the gesture of your discoverer, Christopher Columbus, when he planted the Cross of Christ on this blessed soil."

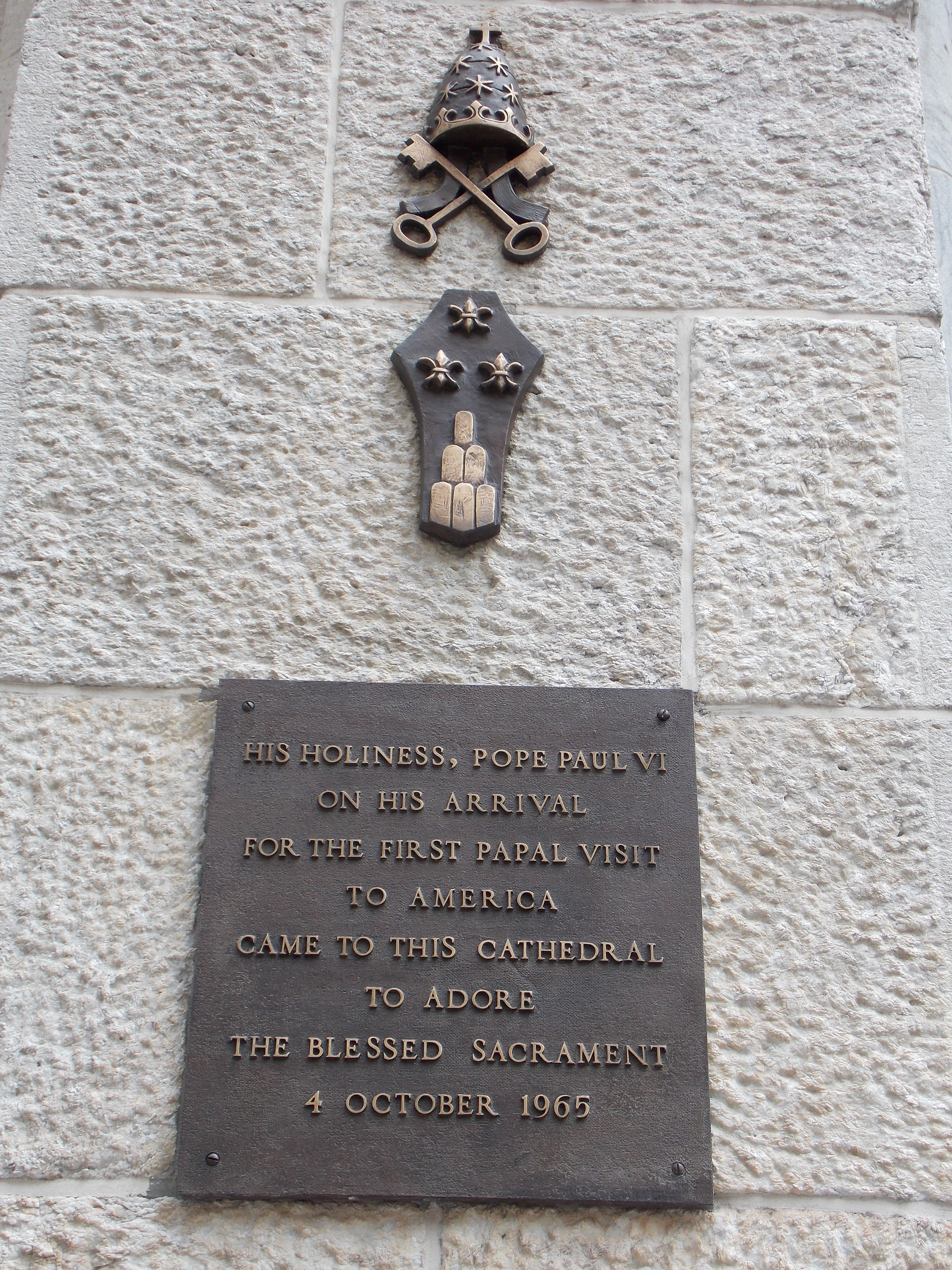
A plaque commemorating Paul VI's visit to St. Patrick's Cathedral

Departing the airport, Paul VI commenced on a 25-mile (40 km) journey through the boroughs of Queens and Manhattan to St. Patrick's Cathedral. The route took him through the Harlem neighborhood of Manhattan and along Fifth Avenue, allowing the pope to see Central Park. At the cathedral, Paul VI conducted Mass services. He additionally blessed the cathedral's cardinal, Francis Spellman, as well as the crowd that had gathered to see him. Afterwards, he had a brief meeting with Spellman at his nearby residence.

Paul VI then went to the Waldorf Astoria New York in order to meet with President Johnson. The meeting was the first time that a reigning pope and a president of the United States had met outside of Vatican City. The two talked about politics and posed for photographs with reporters. In total, the meeting lasted 46 minutes.

Following his meeting with the president, the pope traveled to the UN headquarters, visiting a nearby church as well. Once there, he gave a speech before the United Nations General Assembly, with his primary focus concerning peace in the Atomic Age. Among other things, he pleaded during the speech, "No more war, never again war! Drop your weapons. One cannot love with offensive weapons in hand." He additionally quoted former President John F. Kennedy, the first Catholic president of the United States, by saying, "Mankind must put an end to war or war will put an end to mankind." Following his 35-minute speech, he received a standing ovation from the 2,000 people in attendance, which included Kennedy's widow Jacqueline, his brother Ted, and Ted's wife Joan.

After this, the pope went to Yankee Stadium to preside over a large Mass service. 90,000 people were in attendance, including Senator Robert F. Kennedy and two of his sons. During his speech at the stadium, he announced that a stone that he had brought from St. Peter's Basilica would be blessed and used in the construction of a new seminary for the Roman Catholic Archdiocese of New York.

Following the Yankee Stadium Mass, the pope visited the Vatican's pavilion for the 1964 New York World's Fair, which was being held in Queens. The pavilion housed the Pietà by Michelangelo, which was normally on display at St. Peter's Basilica, but had been authorized for display at the world's fair by Paul VI's immediate predecessor. He left the fair at 10:30 pm, and by midnight, he was flying back to Rome. In total, the trip lasted 14 hours.

With the visit, Paul VI became the first pope to visit the Americas, the Western Hemisphere, and the New World.

== Popular attendance ==
Sources vary on how many people saw the pope during his travel, with different sources giving values of 1 million, 4 million, and 5 million. An additional 100 million people watched the event on television. Following the visit, a shrine dedicated to both Paul VI and the Vatican's world's fair pavilion was erected in Flushing Meadows–Corona Park.

== Later developments ==
In the early 1980s, the United States and the Holy See established diplomatic relations. In the ensuing years, Popes John Paul II, Benedict XVI and Francis have visited the United States, with Time commenting in 2015 that a papal visitation has occurred "at least once a decade" since then. The popes visited New York City and, similar to Paul VI, have held Mass services at Yankee Stadium. During his visit to the United States in 2015, Pope Francis also visited St. Patrick's Cathedral and gave a speech at the United Nations headquarters.

== See also ==
- Catholic Church in the United States
- Holy See and the United Nations
- List of meetings between the pope and the president of the United States
- List of papal visits to the United States
