= List of pastoral trips made by Pope Leo XIV =

Pastoral visits of Pope Leo XIV

Since his election on 8 May 2025, Pope Leo XIV has made seven international trips outside Italy, during which he has visited thirteen countries. His visit to Turkey included an ecumenical commemoration of the 1,700th anniversary of the First Council of Nicaea. His visit to Algeria was the first ever papal visit to the country.

== International visits ==
=== 2025 ===
- Turkey and Lebanon (27 November – 2 December)

Pope Leo XIV arrived in Turkey on 27 November 2025. His visit included a prayer meeting in the Catholic Cathedral in Istanbul. He celebrated the 1,700th anniversary of the First Council of Nicaea with the Ecumenical Patriarch of Constantinople Bartholomew I. The Pope then arrived in Lebanon on 30 November 2025, where he celebrated a public Mass in Beirut. He met with the President Joseph Aoun and other civil authorities, as well as leaders of the Maronite and other Eastern Catholic Churches. The Pope also held an interreligious meeting with Muslim representatives and addressed young people and members of civil society.

=== 2026 ===
- Monaco (28 March)

Prince Albert II invited the Holy Father to visit the Principality during a private audience at the Vatican on 17 January 2026. The visit was part of the ongoing, centuries-old ties that bind the Grimaldi dynasty, which has reigned over Monaco since 1297, to the Successors of Peter. It also aimed to strengthen the “long-standing and trusting” diplomatic relations, according to the press office of the Prince’s Palace, between the two smallest states in the world.

- Algeria, Cameroon, Angola and Equatorial Guinea (13–23 April)

Pope Leo XIV was the first Pope to travel to Algeria. He visited Annaba, the site of the ancient city of Hippo Regius, where Saint Augustine did his work and died. Augustine is the spiritual inspiration of the Augustinian Order, of which Pope Leo was a member. The Pope focused on promoting interfaith dialogue between Christianity and Islam; he visited the Great Mosque of Algiers and held silent prayer. He also met with Algerian president Abdelmadjid Tebboune and paid tribute to the 19 martyrs of Algeria while visiting the Augustinian Missionary Sisters in Bab El Oued. He gave a homily at the Basilica of Our Lady of Africa and offered prayers at a monument for migrants who died in the Mediterranean Sea.

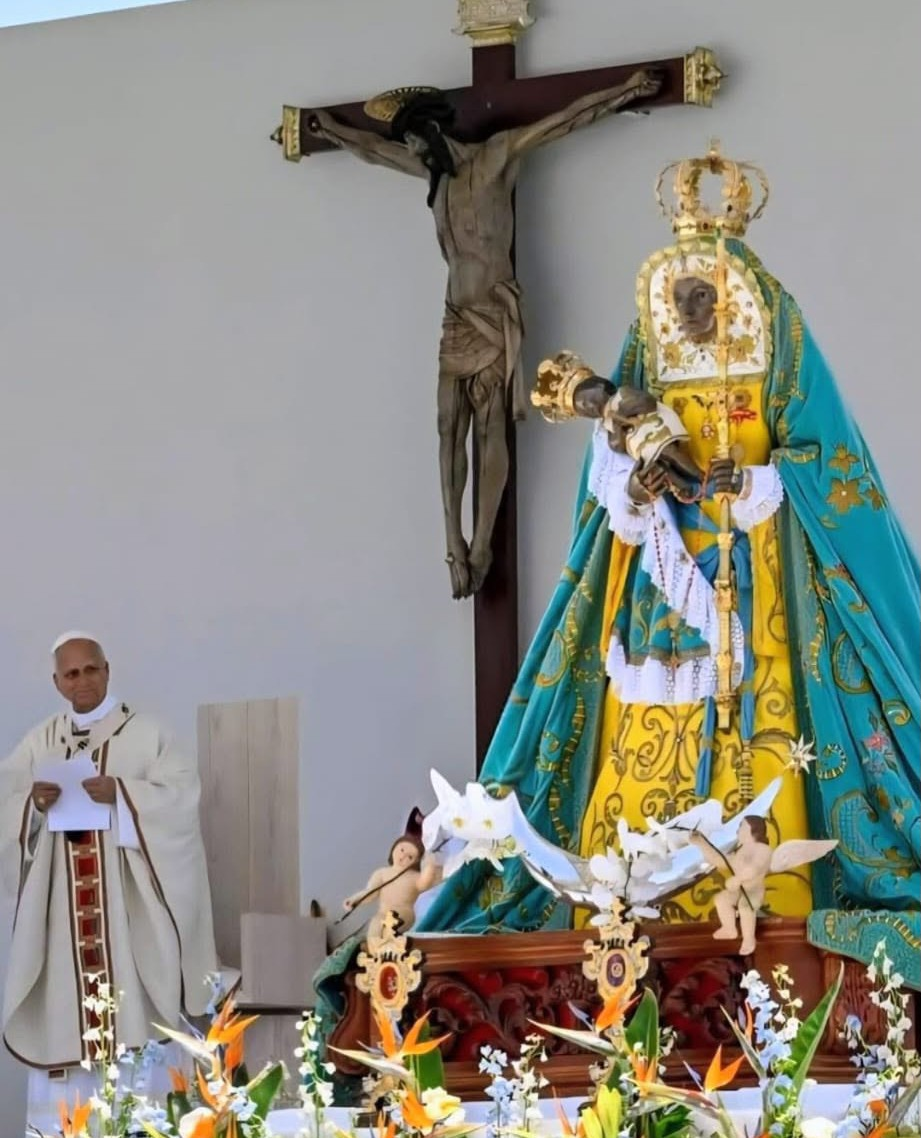
Leo XIV during the closing Mass of his apostolic visit to Spain in Santa Cruz de Tenerife. Next to the Pope is the image of Virgin of Candelaria, patron saint of the Canary Islands, 12 June 2026

- Spain (6–12 June)

Visit to the capital, Madrid (June 6–9), a reception at the Royal Palace by the King of Spain Felipe VI, an address to the Cortes (Parliament), and large gatherings, including a Mass attended by over a million of the faithful. In Barcelona (June 9–10), a visit marked by a vigil at the Montjuïc Olympic Stadium and the inauguration of the Tower of Jesus Christ at the Sagrada Família, marking the centenary of Antoni Gaudí's death. Finally, in the Canary Islands (June 11–12): A stop dedicated to the issue of migration (particularly in Gran Canaria and Tenerife), including a meeting with migrants in La Laguna and a closing Mass in Santa Cruz de Tenerife.

- San Marino (22 August)

The visit coincided with the centenary of diplomatic relations between the Holy See and the small republic, home to about 34,000 inhabitants. It was also the third visit of a Pontiff to San Marino after those made by Saint John Paul II in 1982 and Benedict XVI in 2011.

Pope Leo's journey started at the base of Mount Titano, and arrived in San Marino in the early morning. He first met with civil authorities, including the Captains Regent (Alice Mina and Vladimiro Selva during this visit), and local leaders at the Palazzo Pubblico, delivering an address praising San Marino's commitment to freedom, human dignity, and international peace efforts. He then met with the local clergy, youth, and religious community, giving an address that emphasized the Christian roots established by Saints Marinus (San Marino's namesake) and Leo (the Pope's namesake). He also urged them to meet modern challenges through the Gospel. Pope Leo XIV later visited the Basilica of San Marino to complete his journey that day, and departed to the nearby Italian city of Rimini to continue his pastoral journey.

- France (25–28 September)

He arrived in Paris on Friday, September 25, 2026, and proceeded to the Élysée Palace for a courtesy visit with the President Emmanuel Macron. He later gave a message to the authorities, civil society, and diplomatic corps; his message highlighted the responsibility to protect life. According to reports, Macron initially offered a ceremonial welcome for Leo, which consisted a conferral of the Legion of Honour, a state dinner, and a private tour of the Notre-Dame Cathedral, but Leo reportedly declined the offer.

In the afternoon of September 25, he visited the UNESCO Headquarters, 46 years after the last visit made by Pope John Paul II; in his address to the UNESCO Member States, National Commissions, and members of the UNESCO family from across the world, he highlighted the resounding message of peace and human dignity, while also touching on the responsible use of artificial intelligence. He presided over Vespers at Notre-Dame de Paris, the first visit by a Pope since the Cathedral caught fire and its reopening in 2024, followed a prayer vigil with young people at Stade de France. His visit to Paris concluded with Holy Mass at the Place de la Concorde on Saturday, September 26, with an estimated 800,000 people participating, according to the Vatican.

The second part of the Pope's visit to Frances centered on Lourdes, where he prayed at the Sanctuary of Our Lady of Lourdes and participated in a candlelight procession. He also celebrated Mass at the Praire of the Shrine on Sunday, September 27, and met with the staff and sick community of Accueil Notre Dame. He also met with the Bishops' Conference of France at Lourdes, where he encouraged the bishops to support the spiritual life of family and uphold the voice of the Church. The final part of the apostolic journey took place on Monday, September 28 at Metz, where he held an interreligious meeting and a farewell Mass at Metz Cathedral, before departing back to Rome.

- Uruguay, Argentina and Peru (6–17 November)

The Holy See Press Office announced on 5 August 2026 that Pope Leo XIV will visit South America from 6 to 17 November 2026. Argentina is the homeland of Leo's immediate predecessor, Francis, who, although was born there and served as priest and archbishop of the Archdiocese of Buenos Aires, never returned to Argentina after he became Pope, while Peru is where Leo XIV spent his time as a missionary in the 1980s and as Bishop of Chiclayo (and acquiring citizenship from that country) from 2015 to 2023. The expected places to be visited are:

  - Uruguay (6 to 8 November 2026): Montevideo, Paysandú, and Florida
  - Argentina (8 to 11 November 2026): Buenos Aires, Córdoba, and Luján
  - Peru (11 to 16 November 2026): Lima, Chiclayo, Cusco, and Pucallpa

=== Upcoming visits ===
==== 2027 ====
- South Korea: to participate in the World Youth Day 2027. Pope Leo XIV confirmed this during an in-flight press conference with journalists in 2026 after his Apostolic Visit to France, saying that it was the only 2027 trip confirmed at the time.

==== 2028 ====
- Australia: Pope Leo XIV is expected to visit Sydney in 2028 to attend the International Eucharistic Congress, being held from 24 September to 1 October 2028.

== Visits within Italy ==
Pope Leo XIV has regularly visited churches within the city of Rome and resumed the practice of retreat at Castel Gandolfo.

=== 2025 ===
- Assisi: 20 November

Pope Leo's first visit outside of Rome was to Santa Maria degli Angeli for a meeting with the Italian Bishops Conference.

=== 2026 ===
- Pompeii and Naples: 8 May

Pope Leo visited the Shrine of the Virgin of the Rosary of Pompei, the Naples Cathedral, and then met the faithful in Piazza del Plebiscito.

- Acerra: 23 May

Pope Leo visited the Acerra Cathedral and met with local clergy and families of victims of the Naples waste management crisis in the Triangle of death. He also held an event at the Piazza Nicola Calipari with civic leaders and the broader public.

- Pavia and Sant'Angelo Lodigiano: 20 June
- Lampedusa: 4 July
- Assisi: 6 August

Pope Leo XIV visited with young people for transitus of Saint Francis.

- Rimini: 22 August

Pope Leo attended the 47th Meeting for Friendship among Peoples at the Rimini Expo Centre, followed by tours of key cultural and educational exhibitions at the event. He later visited the Villaggio Ragazzi to meet local youth, families, and young volunteers. In the Great Auditorium, Leo delivered an address on peace, fraternity, and overcoming division, emphasizing the importance of people over borders. Afterwards, he was transported to the Rimini Cathedral and met with approximately 650 people assisted by Caritas, including disabled, sick, and individuals living in poverty. In the evening, he celebrated Mass at the Port of Rimini and returned to the Vatican.

== See also ==
- List of pastoral visits of Pope Paul VI
- List of pastoral visits of Pope John Paul II
- List of pastoral visits of Pope Benedict XVI
- List of pastoral visits of Pope Francis
- List of meetings between the pope and the president of the United States
- Papal travel
- State visit
