= Poverty in Italy =

Poverty in the country of Italy

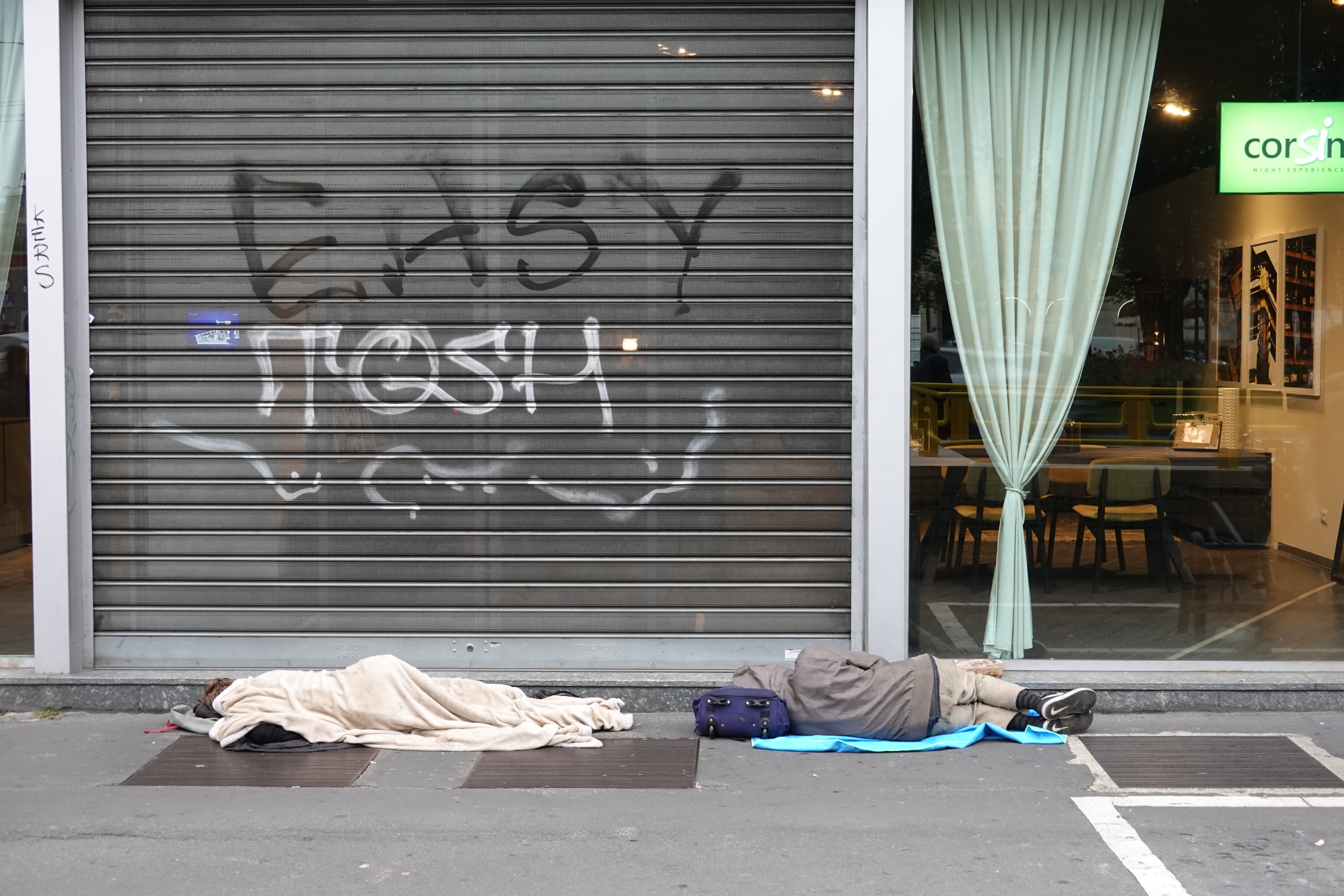
Two rough sleepers in Milan

Poverty in Italy deals with the level of poverty and homelessness in the Southern European country of Italy.

The poverty rate in Italy has increased since the 2008 financial crisis. In 2017, the number of people living in "absolute poverty" rose to 5.1 million, which was the highest in 12 years. According to a report in 2022 by the Italian National Institute of Statistics (ISTAT), over 5.6 million Italians, comprising about 1 in 12 of the Italian population, could not afford the cost of bare essentials. This was attributed mainly to inflation. 3 in 10 (1.6 million; 29%) of those classified as being in 'extreme poverty' were foreigners, representing approximately one-third (32.4%) of all foreigners residing in the country. The 2022 report was off the back of a previous increase caused by the COVID-19 pandemic in Italy.

Furthermore, according to Eurostat, by 2023, 63% of Italian households will face difficulties making ends meet, causing Italy to be one of the European countries with the most widespread economic difficulties, surpassing France, Poland, Spain and Portugal. The European average is 45.5%.

The current Meloni government has previously cut anti-poverty subsidies introduced in 2019, causing protests on May Day.

== History ==
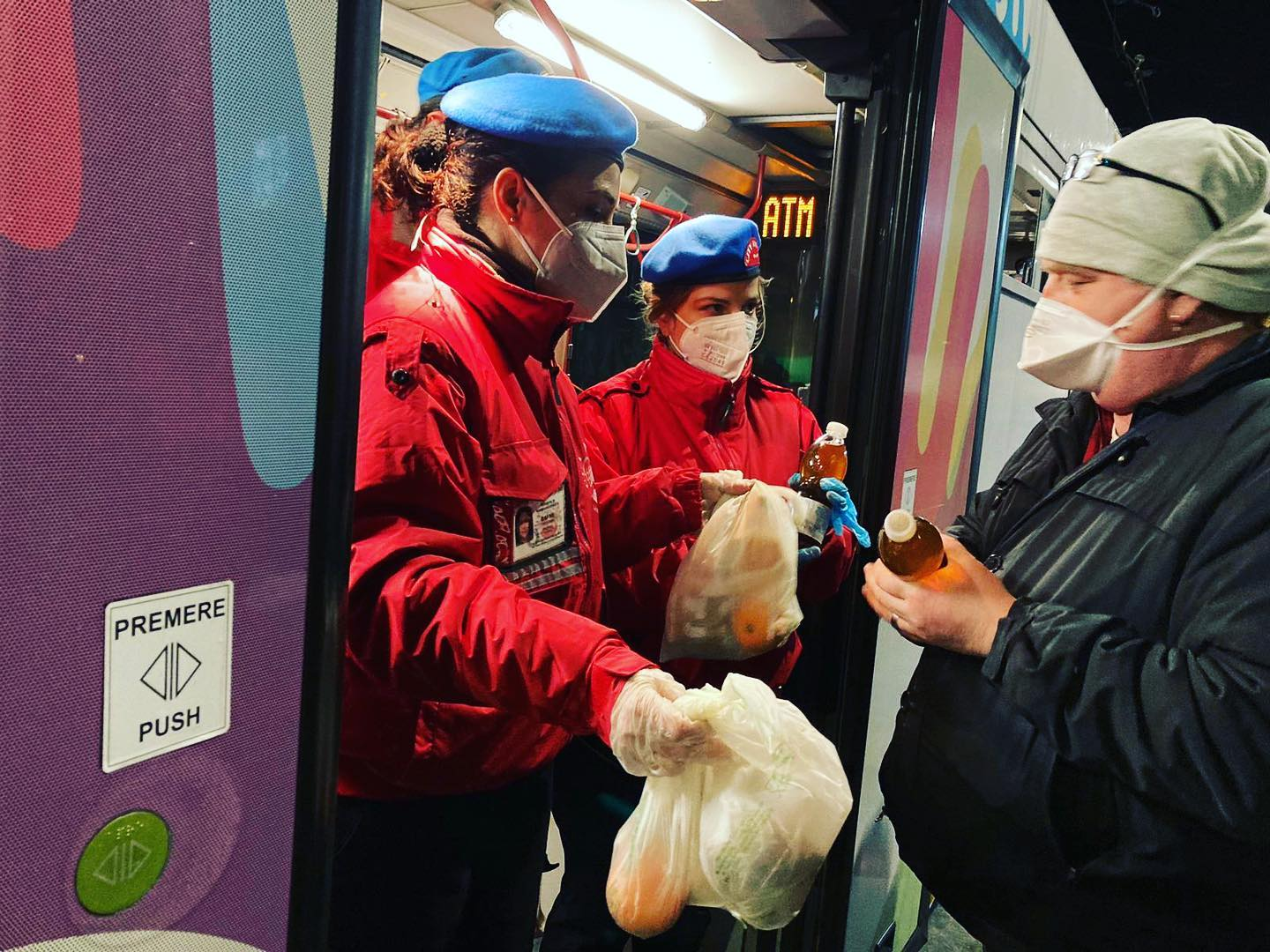
The City Angels organisation providing aid to the homeless in Milan

During the era of Italian unification in 1861, the Italian population, while among the largest in Europe, faced notable economic challenges, with over 40% of individuals having disposable incomes insufficient to meet basic needs. This period was characterised by widespread illiteracy and child labour. Moreover, labour, goods, and capital markets were comparatively underdeveloped, and transportation infrastructures, especially in the Southern regions, were notably inadequate. The subsequent six decades, preceding the rise of Fascism and the global economic crisis of 1929, witnessed significant improvements across various domains, albeit unevenly distributed among sectors and regions.

These measures concluded in a significant reduction of the level of absolute poverty in Italy, to around 26% in 1921. After the economic crisis of 1929, and in the early years of the Fascist regime, absolute poverty began to rise again. Although the Fascist regime adopted a fairly modern social welfare programme for public employees, the needs and risks of the rural population, the urban poor, and the systemically unemployed and underemployed were not adequately addressed. Moreover, some policies resulted in an increase in poverty amongst rural and urban populations, such as the quota 90 revaluation, which saw Mussolini increase the value of the lira with respect to the pound. This, however, caused credit restrictions, the devaluation of wages, and impacted remittances, overall exacerbating poverty levels and affecting various sections of the population, both across rural-urban and the north–south divide.

Throughout the 1890s, Italy had suffered from a famine, and there was a lack of news availability about the situation due to press censorship. Around this time, 88% of convicts belonged to the poorer classes, whereas a mere 12% belonged to the richer classes.

During the 1950s, the high poverty rate in Italy was considered to be contributing to the Italian Communist Party, although Wilfred Beckerman, Emeritus Fellow of Balliol College, Oxford wrote that the poverty levels in Italy during the 1970s were below average in comparison to its European counterparts. European Community policies on combatting poverty have applied across the European Economic Community and European Union, including Italy.

Child poverty in 2008 increased, despite demographic indications it would decrease.

== Causes ==
Poverty in Italy is generally caused by low income and precarious employment situations, rather than lack of a support network. Certain aspects of Italy's poverty patterns trace their origins to the period of Italian unification in the latter half of the 19th century, significantly influencing pre-existing regional economic disparities, notably the north–south divide. These traits were further solidified by the choices made during the post-Second World War reconstruction and the transformative "boom years" of the early 1960s, which witnessed Italy's shift from primarily rural to predominantly urban and industrialised societal structures.

== Homelessness ==
In Italy's capital, Rome, about 8,000 were homeless as of 2021. Deaths increased during the coronavirus pandemic, as many shelters turned people away. Many were also not able to follow lockdown orders, and charities struggled to respond to the crisis, fueling an increase in poverty. During the 2023 European heatwaves, the Italian Red Cross initiated an operation to assist the homeless who were affected by the hot conditions.
