= Papal travel =

Instances in which the Pope leaves Rome

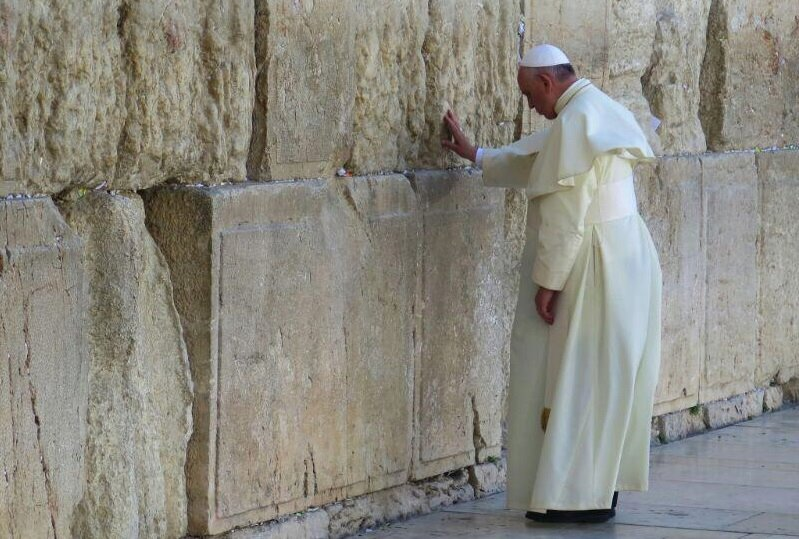
Pope Francis at the Western Wall in Jerusalem, 2014

Papal travel outside Rome has been historically rare, and voluntary travel of the pope was non-existent for the first 500 years of the Papacy. Pope John Paul II (1978–2005) undertook more pastoral trips than all his predecessors combined. Pope Francis (2013–2025), Pope Paul VI (1963–1978) and Pope Benedict XVI (2005–2013) also travelled globally, the latter to a lesser extent due to his advanced age. The current pope, Leo XIV, has traveled internationally as well.

Popes resided outside Rome—primarily in Viterbo, Orvieto, and Perugia—during the 13th century, and then moved to France during the Avignon Papacy (1309–1378). Pope Vigilius (537–555) in 547, Pope Agatho (678–681) in 680, and Pope Constantine in 710 visited Constantinople, whereas Pope Martin I (649–655) was abducted there for trial in 653. Pope Stephen II (752–757) became the first pope to cross the Alps in 752 to crown Pepin the Short; Pope Pius VII repeated the feat over a millennium later for the coronation of Napoleon.

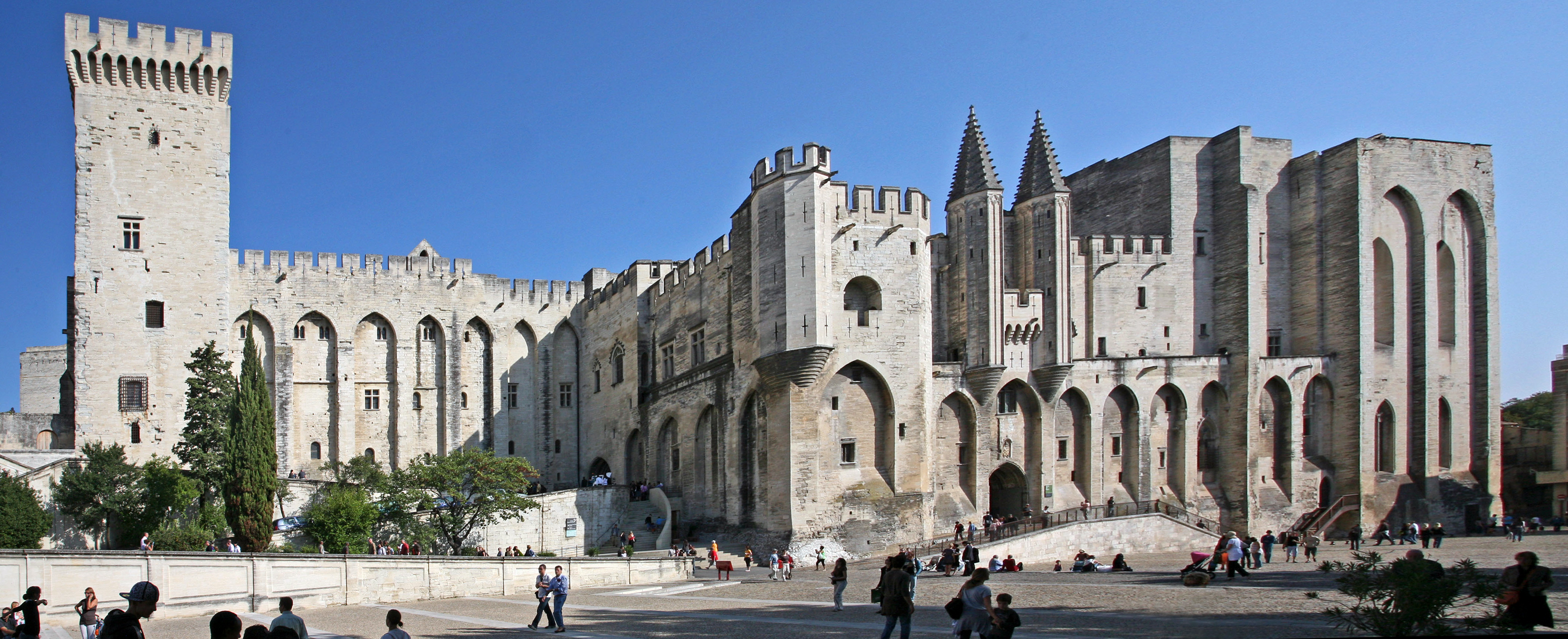
The Palais des Papes in Avignon

== Travel before the Second Vatican Council ==
=== Outside Rome, within Italy ===
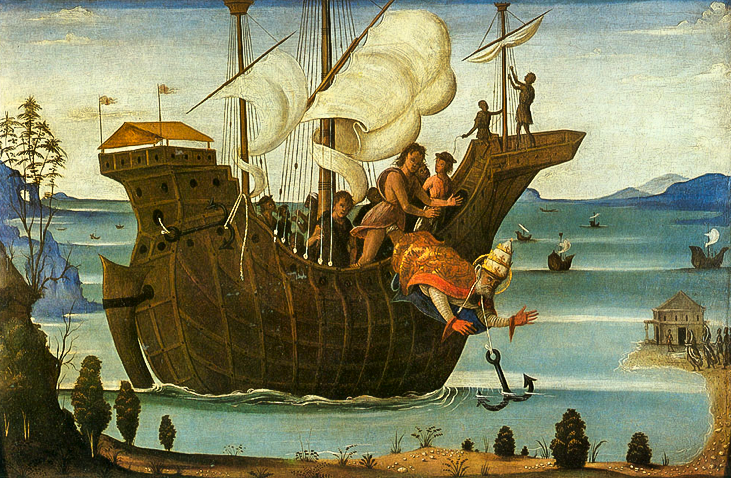
Pope Clement I, the first pope recorded to have left Rome as pope

Pope Clement I was exiled to Chersonesos Taurica by Roman emperor Trajan and then martyred into the Black Sea, according to apocryphal accounts circa 99. Pope Pontian (230–235) died in exile in Sardinia, but resigned his pontificate before leaving the city. Pope Cornelius (251–253) died after a year of exile in Civitavecchia, 80 km from Rome. Pope Liberius (352–366) was the first pope to get far from the city as pope when he was exiled to Beroea in Thrace by Roman Emperor Constantius II. Pope John I (523–526) became the first pope to travel willingly outside Rome when he sailed for Constantinople in 523.

Pope Clement II (1046–1047) was the first pope consecrated outside Rome. Pope Urban II (1088–1099) became the first pope to travel extensively outside Rome. Elected in Terracina, Urban II held synods in Amalfi, Benevento, and Troia. He preached the First Crusade at the Council of Clermont (1095) in Clermont-Ferrand. Prior to this, Pope Leo IX (1049–1054) had been the last pope to cross the Alps for 50 years.

Although the cardinals have historically gathered at a handful of other locations within Rome and beyond, only six elections since 1455 have been held outside the Apostolic Palace, Twenty-eight papal elections have been held outside Rome, in: Terracina (1088), Cluny (1119), Velletri (1181), Verona (1185), Ferrara (Oct. 1187), Pisa (Dec. 1187), Perugia (1216, 1264–1265, 1285, 1292–1294, 1304–1305), Anagni (1243), Naples (1254, 1294), Viterbo (1261, 1268–1271, July 1276, Aug.–Sept. 1276, 1277, 1281–1282), Arezzo (Jan. 1276), Carpentras/Lyon (1314–1316), Avignon (1334, 1342, 1352, 1362, 1370), Konstanz (1417) and Venice (1799–1800).

=== Outside Italy, within Europe ===
==== Constantinople ====
Pope John I (523–526) in 523 (as a delegate of Theodoric the Great), Pope Vigilius (537–555) in 547 (called by Justinian I to account for his refusal to sign on to the canons of the Council of Chalcedon), Pope Agatho (678–681) in 680 (attending the Third Council of Constantinople), and Pope Constantine in 710 visited Constantinople (called by Justinian II), whereas Pope Martin I (649–653) was abducted there for trial in 653 following the Lateran Council of 649. Constantine was the last pope to visit Constantinople until Pope Paul VI in 1967.

==== France ====
Pope Stephen II (752–757) became the first pope to cross the Alps in 752 to crown Pepin the Short. This made him the first pope to visit the Frankish empire. Pope John VIII (872–882) visited France in 878, and Pope Leo IX (1049–1054) travelled to France on September 29, 1049. The next pope to enter France was Pope Urban II (1088–1099), who stopped at Valence and Le Puy on his way to the Council of Clermont (1095).

Pope Pius VII (1800–1823) was in Paris in 1804 for the Coronation of Napoleon I.

==== Holy Roman Empire ====
Pope Benedict VIII (1012–1024) visited Bamberg on 14 April 1020; no pope had visited the borders of modern Germany for 150 years. Pope Leo IX (1049–1054) also travelled through the modern borders of Germany. Probably the last papal visit to the Holy Roman Empire was in 1782, when Pope Pius VI visited Joseph II, Holy Roman Emperor, in Vienna, and Munich in Bavaria.

== Travel since the 1960s ==
Pope Paul VI (1963–1978) became the first pope to leave Europe; no pope ever left Europe before the Second Vatican Council. He was the first to travel by airplane as pope, the first to leave Italy since 1809, and the first to visit North America, South America, Africa, Oceania, and Asia as pope.

Pope John Paul II travelled more often as pope than all his predecessors combined, and as a result he was seen—in person—by more people than anyone else in history. He traveled "721,052 miles (1,160,421 km), which is the equivalent of nearly 31 trips around the planet.

Beginning with Pope Paul VI, the popes used Alitalia as their primary airline, flying on charter flights, until Alitalia went out of business in 2021; after then, Italy's ITA Airways was the main airline used by Pope Francis. Pope John Paul II instituted a tradition of returning to Rome on a flag carrier airline of the last country visited, when possible.

Paul VI (1963–1978)

John Paul II (1978–2005)

Benedict XVI (2005–2013)

Francis (2013–2025)

Leo XIV (2025–present)

== Table of destinations outside Italy (1964–present) ==
The table lists the international trips outside Italy made by Pope Paul VI, Pope John Paul II, Pope Benedict XVI, Pope Francis, and Pope Leo XIV.

Region	Country or territory	NV	Pope and year of visit (Note: column sorts by year of first visit, not by pope's name.)
Central Africa	Angola	3	John Paul II 1992 • Benedict XVI 2009 • Leo XIV 2026
Central Africa	Cameroon	4	John Paul II 1985, 1995 • Benedict XVI 2009 • Leo XIV 2026
Central Africa	Central African Republic	2	John Paul II 1985 • Francis 2015
Central Africa	Chad	1	John Paul II 1990
Central Africa	Congo	1	John Paul II 1980
Central Africa	Democratic Republic of the Congo (Note: Name was changed from the Democratic Republic of the Congo to Zaire on 27 October 1971, and back to the Democratic Republic of the Congo on 16 May 1997.)	3	John Paul II 1980, 1985 • Francis 2023
Central Africa	Equatorial Guinea	2	John Paul II 1982 • Leo XIV 2026
Central Africa	Gabon	1	John Paul II 1982
Central Africa	São Tomé and Príncipe	1	John Paul II 1992
East Africa	Burundi	1	John Paul II 1990
East Africa	Kenya	4	John Paul II 1980, 1985, 1995 • Francis 2015
East Africa	Madagascar	2	John Paul II 1989 • Francis 2019
East Africa	Malawi	1	John Paul II 1989
East Africa	Mauritius	2	John Paul II 1989 • Francis 2019
East Africa	Mozambique	2	John Paul II 1988 • Francis 2019
East Africa	Réunion	1	John Paul II 1989
East Africa	Rwanda	1	John Paul II 1990
East Africa	Seychelles	1	John Paul II 1986
East Africa	South Sudan	1	Francis 2023
East Africa	Tanzania	1	John Paul II 1990
East Africa	Uganda	3	Paul VI 1969 • John Paul II 1993 • Francis 2015
East Africa	Zambia	1	John Paul II 1989
East Africa	Zimbabwe	1	John Paul II 1988
North Africa	Algeria	1	Leo XIV 2026
North Africa	Egypt	2	John Paul II 2000 • Francis 2017
North Africa	Morocco	2	John Paul II 1985 • Francis 2019
North Africa	Sudan	1	John Paul II 1993
North Africa	Tunisia	1	John Paul II 1996
Southern Africa	Botswana	1	John Paul II 1988
Southern Africa	Eswatini (Note: Name was changed from Swaziland to Eswatini on 19 April 2018.)	1	John Paul II 1988
Southern Africa	Lesotho	1	John Paul II 1988
Southern Africa	South Africa	2	John Paul II 1988, 1995
West Africa	Benin	3	John Paul II 1982, 1993 • Benedict XVI 2011
West Africa	Burkina Faso (Note: Name was changed from Upper Volta to Burkina Faso on 6 August 1984.)	2	John Paul II 1980, 1990
West Africa	Cape Verde	1	John Paul II 1990
West Africa	The Gambia	1	John Paul II 1992
West Africa	Ghana	1	John Paul II 1980
West Africa	Guinea	1	John Paul II 1992
West Africa	Guinea-Bissau	1	John Paul II 1990
West Africa	Ivory Coast	3	John Paul II 1980, 1985, 1990
West Africa	Mali	1	John Paul II 1990
West Africa	Nigeria	2	John Paul II 1982, 1998
West Africa	Senegal	1	John Paul II 1992
West Africa	Togo	1	John Paul II 1985
Middle America	The Bahamas	1	John Paul II 1979
Middle America	Belize	1	John Paul II 1983
Middle America	Costa Rica	1	John Paul II 1983
Middle America	Cuba	4	John Paul II 1998 • Benedict XVI 2012 • Francis 2015, 2016
Middle America	Curaçao	1	John Paul II 1990
Middle America	Dominican Republic	3	John Paul II 1979, 1984, 1992
Middle America	El Salvador	2	John Paul II 1983, 1996
Middle America	Guatemala	3	John Paul II 1983, 1996, 2002
Middle America	Haiti	1	John Paul II 1983
Middle America	Honduras	1	John Paul II 1983
Middle America	Jamaica	1	John Paul II 1993
Middle America	Mexico	7	John Paul II 1979, 1990, 1993, 1999, 2002 • Benedict XVI 2012 • Francis 2016
Middle America	Nicaragua	2	John Paul II 1983, 1996
Middle America	Panama	2	John Paul II 1983 • Francis 2019
Middle America	Puerto Rico	1	John Paul II 1984
Middle America	Saint Lucia	1	John Paul II 1986
Middle America	Trinidad and Tobago	1	John Paul II 1985
Northern America	Bermuda	1	Paul VI 1968
Northern America	Canada	4	John Paul II 1984, 1987, 2002 • Francis 2022
Northern America	United States of America	10	Paul VI 1965 • John Paul II 1979, 1981, 1984, 1987, 1993, 1995, 1999 • Benedict XVI 2008 • Francis 2015
South America	Argentina	3	John Paul II 1982, 1987 • Leo XIV 2026
South America	Bolivia	2	John Paul II 1988 • Francis 2015
South America	Brazil	6	John Paul II 1980, 1982, 1991, 1997 • Benedict XVI 2007 • Francis 2013
South America	Chile	2	John Paul II 1987 • Francis 2018
South America	Colombia	3	Paul VI 1968 • John Paul II 1986 • Francis 2017
South America	Ecuador	2	John Paul II 1985 • Francis 2015
South America	Paraguay	2	John Paul II 1988 • Francis 2015
South America	Peru	4	John Paul II 1985, 1988 • Francis 2018 • Leo XIV 2026
South America	Uruguay	3	John Paul II 1987, 1988 • Leo XIV 2026
South America	Venezuela	2	John Paul II 1985, 1996
Central Asia	Kazakhstan	2	John Paul II 2001 • Francis 2022
East Asia	Hong Kong (Note: Hong Kong was a British crown colony at the time of Pope Paul VI's visit in 1970. It was returned to China on 1 July 1997.)	1	Paul VI 1970
East Asia	Japan	2	John Paul II 1981 • Francis 2019
East Asia	Mongolia	1	Francis 2023
East Asia	South Korea	3	John Paul II 1984, 1989 • Francis 2014
South Asia	Bangladesh (Note: Bangladesh was a province of Pakistan under the name of East Pakistan at the time of Pope Paul VI's visit in 1970. It became an independent sovereign state in 1971 following the Bangladesh Liberation War and the Indo-Pakistani War of 1971.)	3	Paul VI 1970 • John Paul II 1986 • Francis 2017
South Asia	India	3	Paul VI 1964 • John Paul II 1986, 1999
South Asia	Pakistan	1	John Paul II 1981
South Asia	Sri Lanka (Note: Name was changed from Ceylon to Sri Lanka on 29 August 1972.)	3	Paul VI 1970 • John Paul II 1995 • Francis 2015
Southeast Asia	Indonesia	3	Paul VI 1970 • John Paul II 1989 • Francis 2024
Southeast Asia	Myanmar	1	Francis 2017
Southeast Asia	Philippines	4	Paul VI 1970 • John Paul II 1981, 1995 • Francis 2015
Southeast Asia	Singapore	2	John Paul II 1986 • Francis 2024
Southeast Asia	Thailand	2	John Paul II 1984 • Francis 2019
Southeast Asia	Timor-Leste (Note: Timor-Leste was a province of Indonesia at the time of Pope John Paul II's visit in 1989. It became an independent sovereign state in 2002 following the 1999 East Timorese crisis and the 1999 East Timorese independence referendum.)	2	John Paul II 1989 • Francis 2024
West Asia	Armenia	2	John Paul II 2001 • Francis 2016
West Asia	Azerbaijan	2	John Paul II 2002 • Francis 2016
West Asia	Bahrain	1	Francis 2022
West Asia	Cyprus	2	Benedict XVI 2010 • Francis 2021
West Asia	Georgia	2	John Paul II 1999 • Francis 2016
West Asia	Iran	1	Paul VI 1970
West Asia	Iraq	1	Francis 2021
West Asia	Israel	4	Paul VI 1964 • John Paul II 2000 • Benedict XVI 2009 • Francis 2014
West Asia	Jordan	4	Paul VI 1964 • John Paul II 2000 • Benedict XVI 2009 • Francis 2014
West Asia	Lebanon	4	Paul VI 1964 • John Paul II 1997 • Benedict XVI 2012 • Leo XIV 2025
West Asia	Palestinian Authority	3	John Paul II 2000 • Benedict XVI 2009 • Francis 2014
West Asia	Syria	1	John Paul II 2001
West Asia	Turkey	5	Paul VI 1967 • John Paul II 1979 • Benedict XVI 2006 • Francis 2014 • Leo XIV 2025
West Asia	United Arab Emirates	1	Francis 2019
Eastern Europe	Bulgaria	2	John Paul II 2002 • Francis 2019
Eastern Europe	Czech Republic	3	John Paul II 1995, 1997 • Benedict XVI 2009
Eastern Europe	Czechoslovakia (Note: Czechoslovakia was split into the independent countries of the Czech Republic and Slovakia on 1 January 1993.)	1	John Paul II 1990
Eastern Europe	Hungary	4	John Paul II 1991, 1996 • Francis 2021, 2023
Eastern Europe	Poland	11	John Paul II 1979, 1983, 1987, 1991 (2), 1995, 1997, 1999, 2002 • Benedict XVI 2006 • Francis 2016
Eastern Europe	Romania	2	John Paul II 1999 • Francis 2019
Eastern Europe	Slovakia	3	John Paul II 1995, 2003 • Francis 2021
Eastern Europe	Ukraine	1	John Paul II 2001
Northern Europe	Denmark	1	John Paul II 1989
Northern Europe	Estonia	2	John Paul II 1993 • Francis 2018
Northern Europe	Finland	1	John Paul II 1989
Northern Europe	Iceland	1	John Paul II 1989
Northern Europe	Latvia	2	John Paul II 1993 • Francis 2018
Northern Europe	Lithuania	2	John Paul II 1993 • Francis 2018
Northern Europe	Norway	1	John Paul II 1989
Northern Europe	Sweden	2	John Paul II 1989 • Francis 2016
Southern Europe	Albania	2	John Paul II 1993 • Francis 2014
Southern Europe	Bosnia and Herzegovina	3	John Paul II 1997, 2003 • Francis 2015
Southern Europe	Croatia	4	John Paul II 1994, 1998, 2003 • Benedict XVI 2011
Southern Europe	Greece	3	John Paul II 2001 • Francis 2016, 2021
Southern Europe	Malta	5	John Paul II 1990 (2), 2001 • Benedict XVI 2010 • Francis 2022
Southern Europe	North Macedonia	1	Francis 2019
Southern Europe	Portugal	8	Paul VI 1967 • John Paul II 1982, 1983, 1991, 2000 • Benedict XVI 2010 • Francis 2017, 2023
Southern Europe	San Marino	3	John Paul II 1982 • Benedict XVI 2011 • Leo XIV 2026
Southern Europe	Slovenia	2	John Paul II 1996, 1999
Southern Europe	Spain	9	John Paul II 1982, 1984, 1989, 1993, 2003 • Benedict XVI 2006, 2010, 2011 • Leo XIV 2026
Western Europe	Austria	4	John Paul II 1983, 1988, 1998 • Benedict XVI 2007
Western Europe	Belgium	3	John Paul II 1985, 1995 • Francis 2024
Western Europe	France	12	John Paul II 1980, 1983, 1986, 1988, 1996, 1997, 2004 • Benedict XVI 2008 • Francis 2014, 2023, 2024 • Leo XIV 2026
Western Europe	Germany (Note: Pope John Paul II's visits to Germany in 1980 and 1987 were made to the Federal Republic of Germany, which was known colloquially as "West Germany" from 1949 to 1990 during the post World War II West–East division of Germany. No reigning pope ever visited the German Democratic Republic ("East Germany") during its existence in the same time frame. German reunification occurred on 3 October 1990.)	6	John Paul II 1980, 1987, 1996 • Benedict XVI 2005, 2006, 2011
Western Europe	Ireland	2	John Paul II 1979 • Francis 2018
Western Europe	Liechtenstein	1	John Paul II 1985
Western Europe	Luxembourg	2	John Paul II 1985 • Francis 2024
Western Europe	Monaco	1	Leo XIV 2026
Western Europe	Netherlands	1	John Paul II 1985
Western Europe	Switzerland	6	Paul VI 1969 • John Paul II 1982, 1984, 1985, 2004 • Francis 2018
Western Europe	United Kingdom	2	John Paul II 1982 • Benedict XVI 2010
Oceania	American Samoa	1	Paul VI 1970
Oceania	Australia	4	Paul VI 1970 • John Paul II 1986, 1995 • Benedict XVI 2008
Oceania	Fiji	1	John Paul II 1986
Oceania	Guam	1	John Paul II 1981
Oceania	New Zealand	1	John Paul II 1986
Oceania	Papua New Guinea	3	John Paul II 1984, 1995 • Francis 2024
Oceania	Samoa (Note: Name was changed from Western Samoa to Samoa on 4 July 1997.)	1	Paul VI 1970
Oceania	Solomon Islands	1	John Paul II 1984

== See also ==
- Eugenio Pacelli's 1936 visit to the United States
- List of papal visits to Brazil
- List of papal visits to the United States
