= List of pastoral trips made by Pope Paul VI =

Nations visited by Paul VI

The list of pastoral visits of Pope Paul VI details the travels of the first pope to leave Italy since 1809, representing the first ever papal pilgrimage to the Holy Land and the first papal visit to Africa, Asia, North America, Oceania, and South America. Pope Paul VI visited six continents, and was the most-travelled pope in history to that time, earning the nickname "the Pilgrim Pope". With his travels he opened new avenues for the papacy, which were continued by his successors Popes John Paul II, Benedict XVI, Francis, and Leo XIV. He traveled to Jordan and Israel in 1964 where he met with Ecumenical Patriarch Athenagoras I in Jerusalem which led to rescinding the excommunications of the Great Schism, which took place in 1054. The Pope also traveled to the Eucharistic Congresses in Bombay, India and Bogotá, Colombia. The first papal visit to the United States occurred on 4 October 1965, when Paul VI visited New York City to address the United Nations at the invitation of Secretary-General U Thant. During that visit, the Pope first stopped at St. Patrick's Cathedral where some 55,000 people lined the streets to greet him, met with President Lyndon B. Johnson at the Waldorf Astoria, addressed the United Nations General Assembly, celebrated Mass at Yankee Stadium, and viewed Michelangelo's Pieta at the New York World's Fair in Queens. Fifty years after the first apparition of Our Lady of Fátima, he visited the shrine in Fátima, Portugal in 1967. He undertook a pastoral visit to Africa in 1969. After a 1970 trip to several Asian and Pacific nations, he made no additional international trips. He died on August 6, 1978.

== Travels outside Italy ==
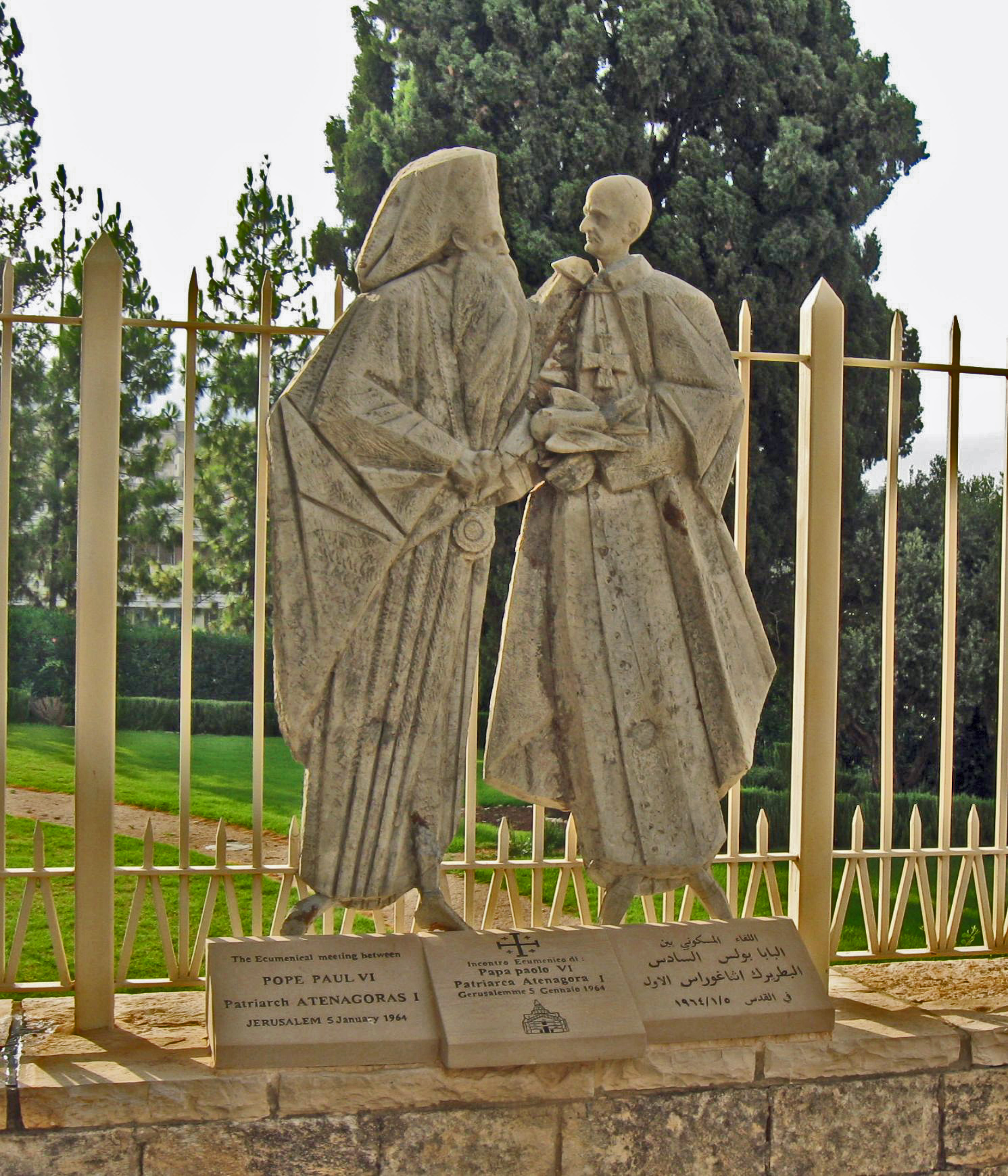
Commemorative sculpture of the meeting between Paul VI and Patriarch Athenagoras I in Jerusalem

Voyage	Date	Nations Visited	Places Visited	Notes
1.	4–6 January 1964	Jordan	Amman, Jerusalem Old City (Jordanian side), Bethlehem	This was the first time a reigning pontiff had flown on an airplane, the first papal pilgrimage to the Holy Land, and the first time a Pope had left Italy in more than a century. Paul VI met King Hussein of Jordan in Amman and Patriarch Athenagoras I of Constantinople on the Mount of Olives in Jerusalem.
1.	5 January 1964	Israel	Megiddo, Nazareth, Sea of Galilee	This was the first time a reigning pontiff had flown on an airplane, the first papal pilgrimage to the Holy Land, and the first time a Pope had left Italy in more than a century. Paul VI met King Hussein of Jordan in Amman and Patriarch Athenagoras I of Constantinople on the Mount of Olives in Jerusalem.
2.	2 December 1964	Lebanon	Beirut	stopover
2.	2–5 December 1964	India	Bombay	Attended the 38th International Eucharistic Congress
3.	4 October 1965	United States	New York City	1965 visit by Pope Paul VI to the United States
4.	13 May 1967	Portugal	Fátima	Pilgrimage to the Marian shrine, the Sanctuary of Fátima
5.	25–26 July 1967	Turkey	Istanbul, Ephesus, Smyrna	Second meeting with Patriarch Athenagoras I of Constantinople.
6.	22–24 August 1968	Colombia	Bogotá	Attended the 39th International Eucharistic Congress in Bogotá.
6.	24 August 1968	Bermuda	Hamilton	Stopover
7.	10 June 1969	Switzerland	Geneva	Paul VI addressed the International Labour Organization.
8.	31 July–2 August 1969	Uganda	Kampala, Namugongo	The first papal visit to an African country. The Pope attended the Eucharistic celebration in Kampala at the conclusion of the Symposium organized by the Bishops of Africa. He met the President of Uganda, Milton Obote, and members of the Parliament of Uganda. Meeting with the representatives of the religious leaders of Uganda.
9.	26–27 November 1970	Iran	Tehran	The Pope's last international trip took him to nine countries. He met several heads of state including Shah Mohammad Reza Pahlavi of Iran, President Ferdinand Marcos of the Philippines, the O le Ao o le Malo of Samoa Malietoa Tanumafili II, Governor-General Paul Hasluck of Australia, and President Suharto of Indonesia. On 27 November 1970, the Pope was the target of an assassination attempt by Benjamín Mendoza y Amor Flores at Manila International Airport in the Philippines. On 16 September 1972, a documentary film about the Pope's Philippine visit premiered at the Greenhills theater in San Juan, Rizal, Philippines.
9.	27 November 1970	Pakistan (Note: This visit was to East Pakistan which is now the separate nation of Bangladesh. Bangladesh was a province of Pakistan under the name of "East Pakistan" at the time of Pope Paul VI's visit in 1970. It became an independent sovereign state in 1971 following the Bangladesh Liberation War and the Indo-Pakistani War of 1971.)	Dhaka	
9.	27-29 November 1970	Philippines	Manila	
9.	30 November 1970	American Samoa	Pago Pago	
9.	30 November 1970	Western Samoa	Leulumoega	
9.	30 November–3 December 1970	Australia	Sydney	
9.	3–4 December 1970	Indonesia	Jakarta	
9.	4 December 1970	Hong Kong (Note: Hong Kong was a British crown colony at the time of Pope Paul VI's visit in 1970. It was returned to China on 1 July 1997.)	Hong Kong	
9.	4–5 December 1970	Ceylon (Note: Name was changed from Ceylon to Sri Lanka on 29 August 1972.)	Colombo	

== Travels in Italy ==
- 11 August 1964: Orvieto

Pilgrimage on the occasion of the 700th anniversary of the bull "Transiturus".

- 24 October 1964: Montecassino
- 10 June 1965: Pisa

The Pope attended the National Eucharistic Congress.

- 1 September 1966: Alatri, Fumone, Ferentino and Anagni
- 11 September 1966: Carpineto Romano and Colleferro
- 24 December 1966: Florence

The Pope visited Florence, affected by severe flooding on November 4 of that year.

- 24–25 December 1968: Taranto
- 24 April 1970: Cagliari
- 3 September 1971: Albano
- 8 September 1971: Subiaco
- 16 September 1972: Udine, Venice and Aquileia

The Pope attended the National Eucharistic Congress in Udine.

- 24 December 1972: Ponzano Romano and Sant'Oreste
- 14 September 1974: Aquino
- 8 August 1976: Bolsena

The pope visited Bolsena on the occasion of the closing of the International Eucharistic Congress in Philadelphia.

- 17 September 1977: Pescara

The Pope attended the National Eucharistic Congress.

== See also ==
- List of pastoral visits of Pope John Paul II
- List of pastoral visits of Pope Benedict XVI
- List of pastoral visits of Pope Francis
- List of pastoral visits of Pope Leo XIV
- List of meetings between the pope and the president of the United States
- State visit
