= Wilfred Beckerman =

English economist and professor

- Born: 19 May 1925; London, United Kingdom
- Died: 18 April 2020 (aged 94)
- Education: Trinity College, Cambridge (BA, 1948; PhD, 1950)
- Years active: 1950–2020
- Known for: Contributions to economics, specifically environmental economics
- Spouse(s): Nicole Ritter (m. 1952; died 1979) Joanna Pasek (m. 1991)

Wilfred Beckerman (19 May 1925 – 18 April 2020) was an English economist, professor, and author. Beckerman served as a fellow and tutor of Balliol College, Oxford, from 1964 until his departure to University College London in 1969. Beckerman served at UCL until 1975, in which he returned to Balliol. Beckerman served as a tutor, and later an Emeritus Fellow at the college, until his death in 2020.

As well as serving in his capacity at the two universities, Beckerman also authored and edited numerous books, primarily focused on environmental economics, with a left-wing political stance.

== Early life and education ==
Wilfred Beckerman was born 19 May 1925, in London to Moishe and Mathilda Beckerman, poor Jewish immigrants from Poland a Ukraine. He was the second youngest of six children.

At age 15, he dropped out of Ealing County School to support the family, though he spent a term studying at the London School of Economics. At 18, he joined the Royal Navy; following World War II, he became eligible to receive free post-secondary education, eventually registering at Trinity College, Cambridge. He earned a BA in economics in 1948 and a PhD in 1950.

== Career ==
Beckerman began his career lecturing at the University of Nottingham, though in 1952, he began working with the Organisation for Economic Co-operation and Development (OECD), eventually becoming head of division.

From 1964 to 1969, Beckerman was a fellow and tutor in economics at Balliol College, Oxford. For a short time in 1967, he also served as an economic advisor to President of the Board of Trade, Anthony Crosland. In 1969, Beckerman transferred to University College London (UCL), serving as a professor and head of the political economy department. During his tenure at UCL, Beckerman became an advisor for the initial Royal Commission on Environmental Pollution. In 1975, he returned to his former position at Balliol College, where he remained until being named an Emeritus Fellow, a position he held until his death in 2020.

== Personal life ==
In 1952, Beckerman married Nicole Ritter, who was raised Roman Catholic. The couple had three children: Stephen, Sophia, and Deborah. Ritter died from breast cancer in 1979.

In 1991, Beckerman married Joanna Pasek, becoming a step-father to her daughter, Agnieszka. The couple also had a daughter, Beatrice.

Beckerman died April 18, 2020.

== Publications ==
=== As author ===
- Beckerman, Wilfred (1968). An Introduction to National Income Analysis. London: Weidenfeld & Nicolson. ISBN 978-0-297-76154-9.
- Beckerman, Wilfred (1974). In Defence of Economic Growth. London: Jonathan Cape. ISBN 978-0-224-00930-0.
- Beckerman, Wilfred (1975). Pricing for Pollution: an analysis of market pricing and government regulation in environment consumption and policy. Hobart papers. London: Inst. of Economic Affairs. ISBN 978-0-255-36077-7.
- Beckerman, Wilfred (1975). Two Cheers for the Affluent Society: A Spirited Defense of Economic Growth. St. Martin's Press. ISBN 978-0-312-82600-0.
- Beckerman, Wilfred (1978). Measures of Leisure, Equality and Welfare. Organisation for Economic Co-operation and Development. Paris: OECD. ISBN 978-92-64-11766-2.
- Beckerman, Wilfred (1995). Growth, the Environment and the Distribution of Incomes: Essays by a Sceptical Optimist. Economists of the twentieth century. Aldershot: Elgar. ISBN 978-1-85898-262-5.
- Beckerman, Wilfred (1995). Small Is Stupid: Blowing the Whistle on the Greens. London: Duckworth. ISBN 978-0-7156-2640-5.
- Beckerman, Wilfred (1996). Through Green Colored Glasses: Environmentalism Reconsidered. Washington, D.C: Cato Institute. ISBN 978-1-882577-35-4.
- Beckerman, Wilfred (2003). A Poverty of Reason: Sustainable Development and Economic Growth. Oakland, Calif: Independent Institute. ISBN 978-0-945999-85-0.
- Beckerman, Wilfred; Pasek, Joanna (2004). Justice, Posterity, and the Environment. Oxford: Oxford University Press. ISBN 978-0-19-924508-6.
- Beckerman, Wilfred (2011). Economics as Applied Ethics: Value Judgements in Welfare Economics. Houndmills, Basingstoke, Hampshire; New York: Palgrave Macmillan. ISBN 978-0-230-27836-3. OCLC 650213790.
  - Beckerman, Wilfred (2017). Economics as Applied Ethics: Fact and Value in Economic Policy (2nd ed.). New York, NY: Springer Berlin Heidelberg. ISBN 978-3-319-50318-9.

=== As editor ===
- Beckerman, Wilfred, ed. (1972). The Labour Government's Economic Record: 1964-1970. London: Duckworth. ISBN 978-0-7156-0608-7.
- Beckerman, Wilfred, ed. (1979). Slow Growth in Britain: Causes and Consequence. Oxford : New York: Clarendon Press; Oxford University Press. ISBN 978-0-19-828420-8.
