= List of papal visits to the United States =

Papal visits to the United States have been made by four popes between 1965 and 2015. There have been a total of 10 trips which included visits to 23 cities in 17 states and the District of Columbia. In addition, three cities in U.S. territories have received papal visits as well.

== Precursor events ==
=== Pope Pius IX ===
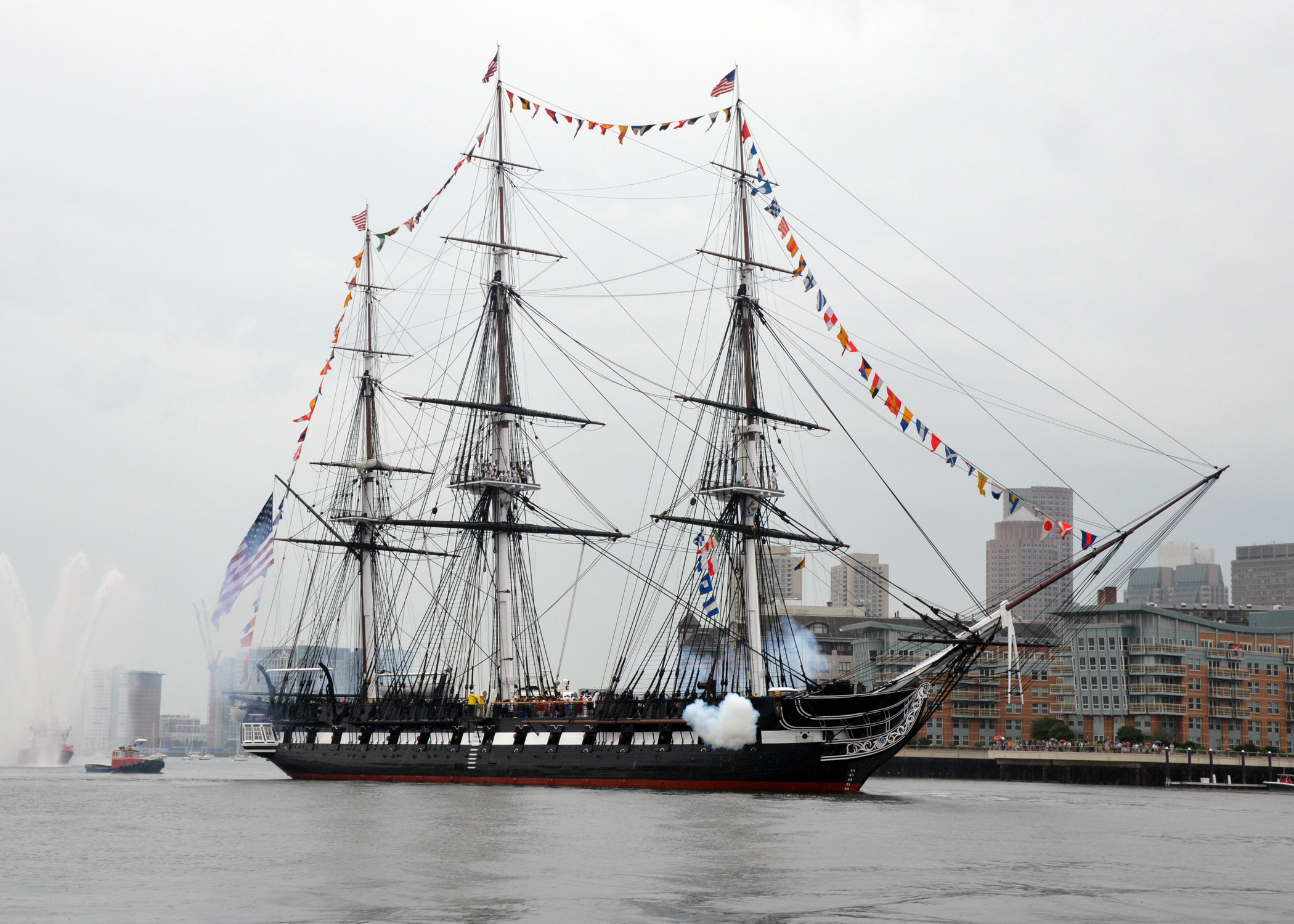
The USS Constitution (pictured in 2014) was visited by Pope Pius IX on August 1, 1849.

Pope Pius IX fled Rome and took refuge in the city of Gaeta in November 1848 due to the establishment of the Roman Republic. He remained in Gaeta until September 4, 1849. Pope Pius IX and King Ferdinand II of the Two Sicilies went onboard the USS Constitution while it was in port at Gaeta on August 1, 1849. As commissioned ships possess extraterritoriality, this was the first time a pope set foot on American territory or its equivalent.

=== Pope Pius XII ===
Eugenio Cardinal Pacelli (the soon-to-be Pope Pius XII) visited the United States from October 8 to November 6, 1936 as Cardinal Secretary of State and Camerlengo of the Holy Roman Church. At the time, Pacelli was the highest-ranking Catholic official ever to visit the United States. Although he did not visit the United States as Pope, he was the first Pope who visited the United States at any time in his life. Pacelli met with President Franklin D. Roosevelt at the president's home in Hyde Park, New York, on November 5, 1936.

=== Pope Leo XIV ===
Robert Francis Prevost, later known as Pope Leo XIV, was born in Chicago, Illinois, on September 14, 1955, and lived in the United States throughout his early years before beginning his missionary work in Peru in 1985. He thus spent time in the country before any reigning pope did.

== Visits to the United States by reigning popes ==
=== Pope Paul VI ===
The first papal visit to the United States itself occurred on October 4, 1965, when Pope Paul VI visited New York City to address the United Nations at the invitation of Secretary-General U Thant. During that visit, the Pope first stopped at St. Patrick's Cathedral where some 55,000 people lined the streets to greet him, met with President Lyndon B. Johnson at the Waldorf Astoria, addressed the United Nations General Assembly, celebrated Mass at Yankee Stadium, and viewed Michelangelo's Pieta at the New York World's Fair in Queens.

=== Pope John Paul II ===
Pope John Paul II visited the United States from October 1 to 7, 1979. He arrived in Boston on October 1 after a visit to Ireland. The next two days were spent in New York City, where he addressed the United Nations General Assembly. The pope later spoke to students gathered at Madison Square Garden, and conducted Mass at the original Yankee Stadium for 75,000 people as well as at Shea Stadium to an audience of over 52,000. He arrived in Philadelphia on October 3. The pope traveled to Des Moines, Iowa, and visited the Living History Farms and said Mass to an audience of around 340,000 on October 4, 1979. He traveled to Chicago later that same day, there he celebrated Mass in Grant Park, met with civic leaders and Chicago's Polish community. Chicago was the largest Catholic archdiocese in the United States at the time and the home of the largest Polish community outside of Poland. He concluded his pilgrimage to the U.S. in Washington, D.C., where he became the first pope to visit the White House where he met with President Jimmy Carter.

President Ronald Reagan meeting with Pope John Paul II at the Fairbanks International Airport on May 2, 1984.

John Paul II made two stopovers in Alaska. The first occurred in Anchorage on February 26, 1981 following a trip to Asia and the second was in Fairbanks on May 2, 1984, which included a meeting with President Ronald Reagan.

A large-scale visit was carried out from September 10 to 19, 1987. John Paul II first traveled to Miami, where he met with President Reagan at the Vizcaya Museum. A Mass at Tamiami Park was cut short before the pope could give Communion, due to a lightning storm that made it unsafe to continue. Meeting with local Jewish leaders at Miami's Center for the Fine Arts, John Paul II condemned antisemitism but did not apologize for a recent meeting with Austrian president and former United Nations Secretary-General Kurt Waldheim, whose involvement in Nazi war crimes had been exposed months earlier.

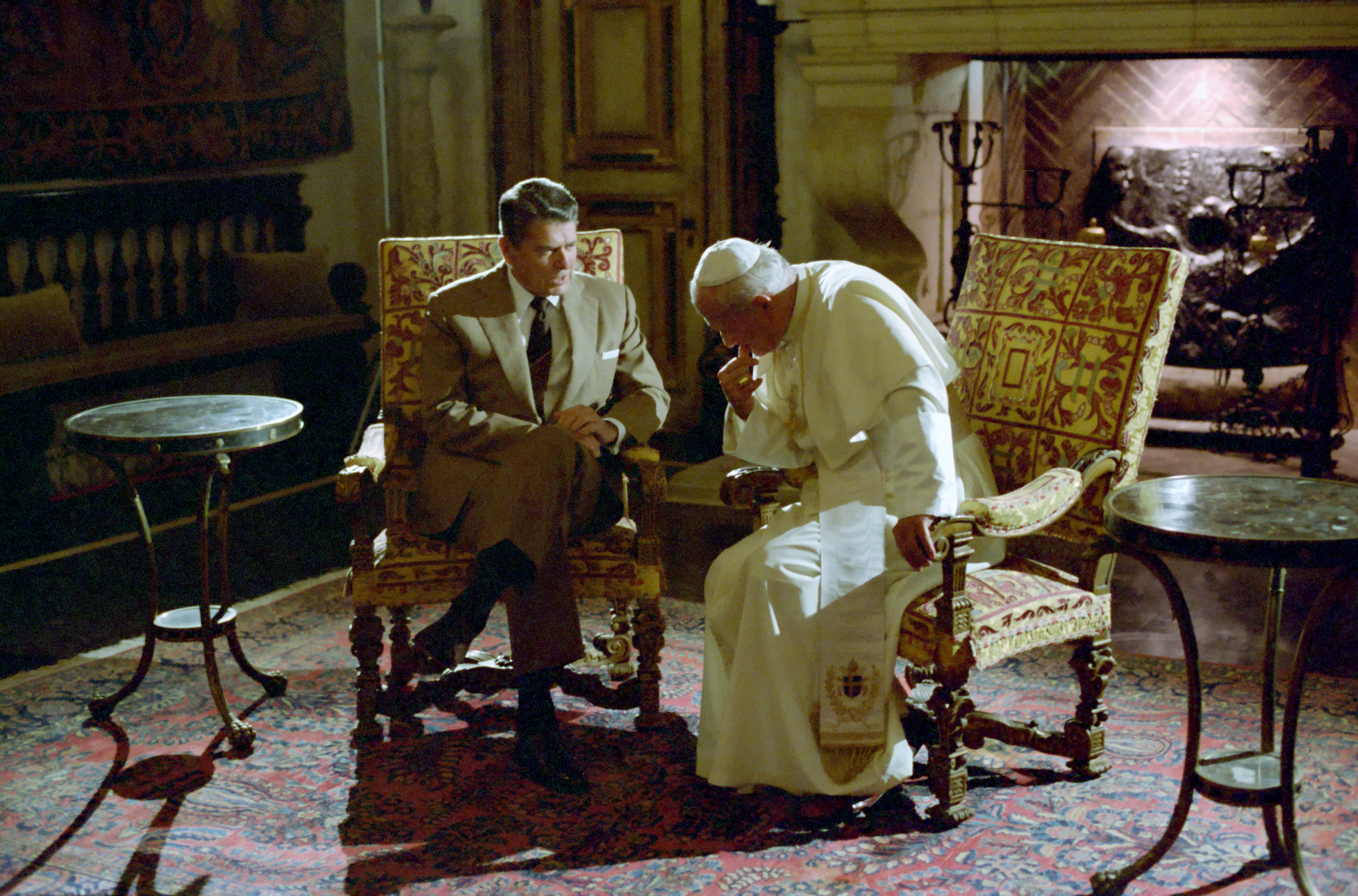
President Ronald Reagan with Pope John Paul II at the Vizcaya Museum in Miami.

The pope spent five hours in Columbia, South Carolina, meeting with Protestant leaders at Williams–Brice Stadium in an area with a very small Catholic population, and briefly greeting former president Jimmy Carter at the airport. In New Orleans, the pope condemned racism in a convocation at Xavier University of Louisiana, the nation's only historically black Catholic university. He held another outdoor Mass at New Orleans University, held a youth rally at the Superdome, and traveled in a motorcade down the city's famed Mardi Gras parade route. The pope addressed immigration from Mexico and celebrated Sunday Mass in San Antonio, Texas, where a temporary altar built for the service collapsed days before and had to be quickly rebuilt. At the Arizona Veterans Memorial Coliseum in Phoenix, John Paul II spoke to 16,000 Native American Catholics and defended the controversial decision to consider Junípero Serra, a Spanish missionary who helped to colonize California, for sainthood. In Los Angeles, the pope warned a gathering of entertainment industry leaders to use their immense influence responsibly, and he instructed a conference of 300 American bishops to strictly follow church doctrine even where it is unpopular with the laity, particularly regarding issues such as divorce, abortion, and homosexuality. John Paul II discussed agricultural labor issues and acknowledged the 200th anniversary of the signing of the U.S. Constitution while speaking at Laguna Seca Raceway in Monterey, California. In San Francisco, the pope met with AIDS patients at the Mission Dolores Basilica, many of them gay men, and celebrated Mass at Candlestick Park. The pope's final stop on this trip was in Detroit, where he greeted the Polish-American community in Hamtramck and celebrated the last Mass of the journey at the Pontiac Silverdome. Vice President George H. W. Bush met with the pope before his departure on September 19, 1987. During the 10-day visit to the United States, crowds were significantly less than during the 1979 tour, and extensive preparations to maintain order and divert traffic sometimes proved unnecessary.

The pope visited Denver from August 10 to 15, 1993 for World Youth Day 1993 and met President Bill Clinton at Regis University.

Another multi-city visit occurred October 4–9, 1995 when the pope traveled to Newark, East Rutherford, New York City, Yonkers, and Baltimore. This visit included an address to the United Nations on the 50th anniversary of its establishment and a Mass at Giants Stadium before a crowd of 82,948, the second-largest to ever attend an event at Giants Stadium.

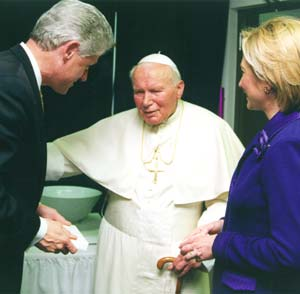
President Bill Clinton meeting with Pope John Paul II in St. Louis, Missouri.

John Paul II's final visit to the United States was to St. Louis, Missouri, on January 26–27, 1999, as a stop on his return from a trip to Mexico City. Conducting Mass at the Trans World Dome, the pope criticized the death penalty and urged clemency for Darrell Mease, a Missouri prisoner who had been scheduled for execution on January 27. Mease's execution was postponed and ultimately canceled by Missouri governor Mel Carnahan, who said that meeting with the pope had convinced him to commute the sentence.

=== Pope Benedict XVI ===
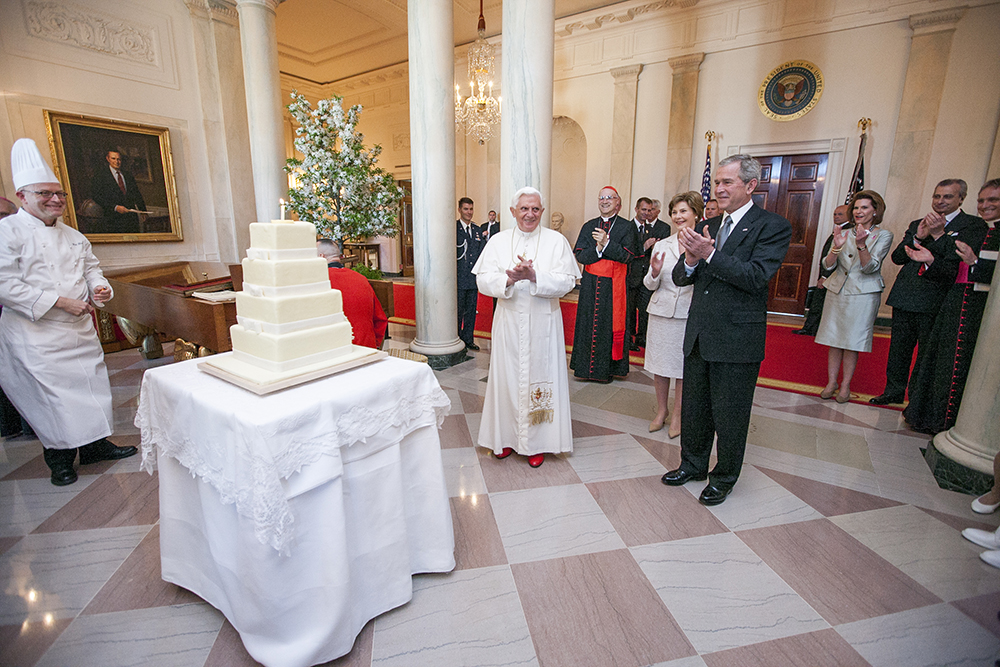
Pope Benedict XVI celebrates his 81st birthday with President George W. Bush and First Lady Laura Bush, April 16, 2008

Pope Benedict XVI's visit to the United States took place from April 15 to 20, 2008. It was his only visit to the United States.

=== Pope Francis ===
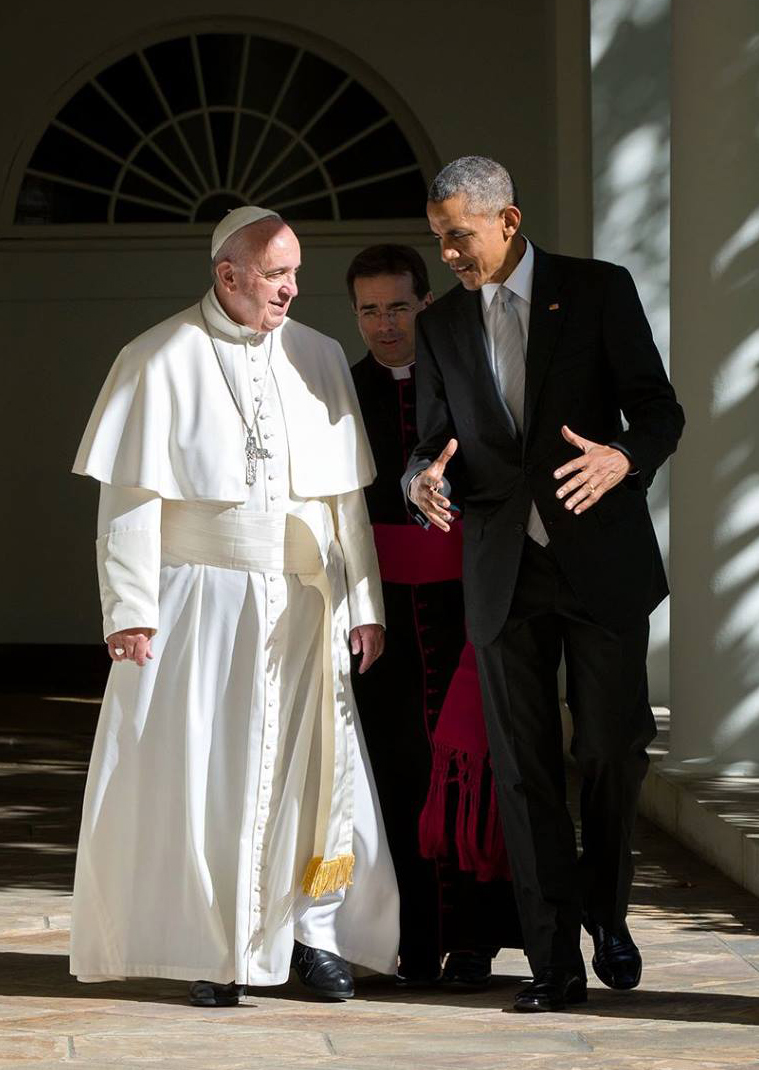
Pope Francis and President Barack Obama at the White House, September 23, 2015

Pope Francis's visit to the United States consisted of three cities: Washington, D.C., New York City including his visit to the United Nations, and Philadelphia which hosted the World Meeting of Families. He became the first pope to address a joint session of the United States Congress, at the invitation of House Speaker John Boehner and Minority Leader Nancy Pelosi, both Catholics.

== Visits to territories of the United States ==
Pope Paul VI visited Pago Pago, American Samoa, on November 30, 1970, as part of his tour of Asia and Oceania.

Pope John Paul II visited Agaña, (Note: Name was changed from Agaña to Hagåtña in 1998.) Guam on February 22–23, 1981, and San Juan, Puerto Rico, on October 12, 1984.

== Tables ==
=== Table of destinations in the United States ===
City	State or district	NV	Pope and year of visit (Note: column sorts by date of first visit, not by pope's name.)
Anchorage	Alaska	1	John Paul II 1981
Baltimore	Maryland	1	John Paul II 1995
Boston	Massachusetts	1	John Paul II 1979
Chicago	Illinois	1	John Paul II 1979
Columbia	South Carolina	1	John Paul II 1987
Denver	Colorado	1	John Paul II 1993
Des Moines	Iowa	1	John Paul II 1979
Detroit	Michigan	1	John Paul II 1987
East Rutherford	New Jersey	1	John Paul II 1995
Fairbanks	Alaska	1	John Paul II 1984
Los Angeles	California	1	John Paul II 1987
Miami	Florida	1	John Paul II 1987
Monterey	California	1	John Paul II 1987
New Orleans	Louisiana	1	John Paul II 1987
New York City	New York	5	Paul VI 1965 • John Paul II 1979, 1995 • Benedict XVI 2008 • Francis 2015
Newark	New Jersey	1	John Paul II 1995
Philadelphia	Pennsylvania	2	John Paul II 1979 • Francis 2015
Phoenix	Arizona	1	John Paul II 1987
St. Louis	Missouri	1	John Paul II 1999
San Antonio	Texas	1	John Paul II 1987
San Francisco	California	1	John Paul II 1987
Washington	District of Columbia	3	John Paul II 1979 • Benedict XVI 2008 • Francis 2015
Yonkers	New York	2	John Paul II 1995 • Benedict XVI 2008

=== Table of destinations in the territories of the United States ===
City	Territory	NV	Pope and year of visit (Note: column sorts by date of first visit, not by pope's name.)
Agaña	Guam	1	John Paul II 1981
Pago Pago	American Samoa	1	Paul VI 1970
San Juan	Puerto Rico	1	John Paul II 1984

== See also ==
- Catholic Church in the United States
- History of the Catholic Church in the United States
- List of pastoral trips made by Pope Paul VI
- List of pastoral trips made by Pope John Paul II
- List of pastoral trips made by Pope Benedict XVI
- List of pastoral trips made by Pope Francis
- List of meetings between the pope and the president of the United States
- Papal travel
