= Death and funeral of Pope Benedict XVI =

2023 funeral of former head of the Catholic Church

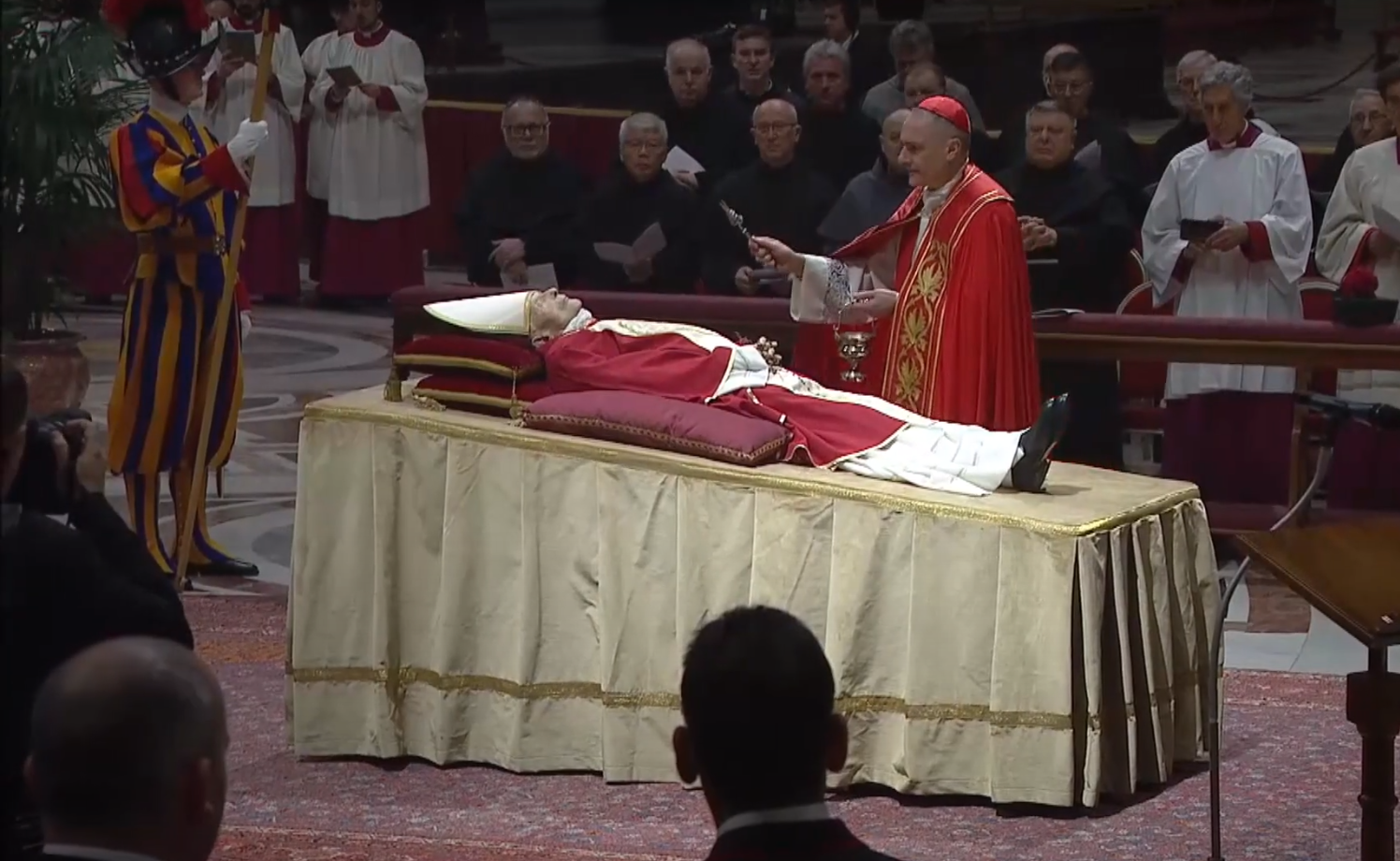
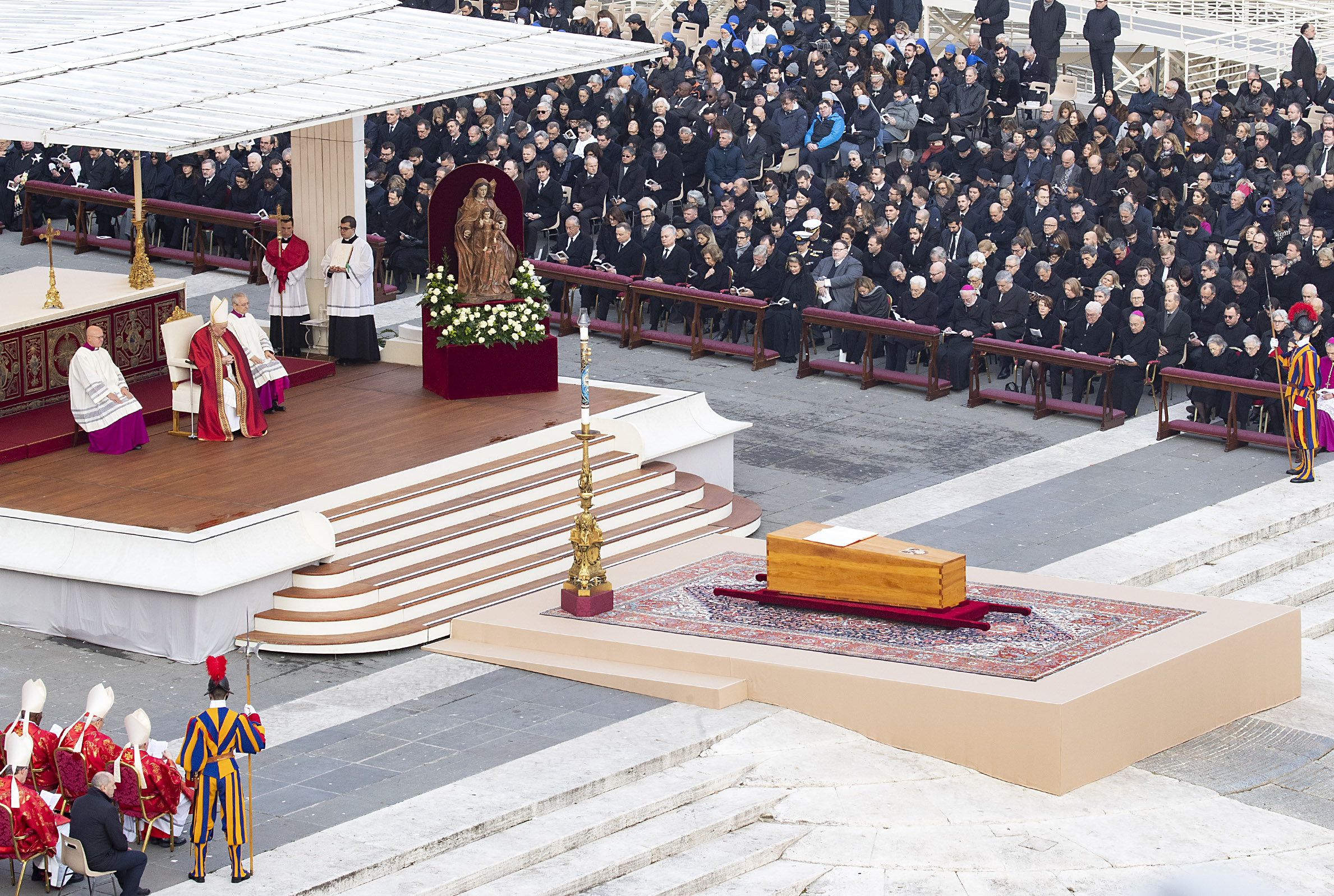
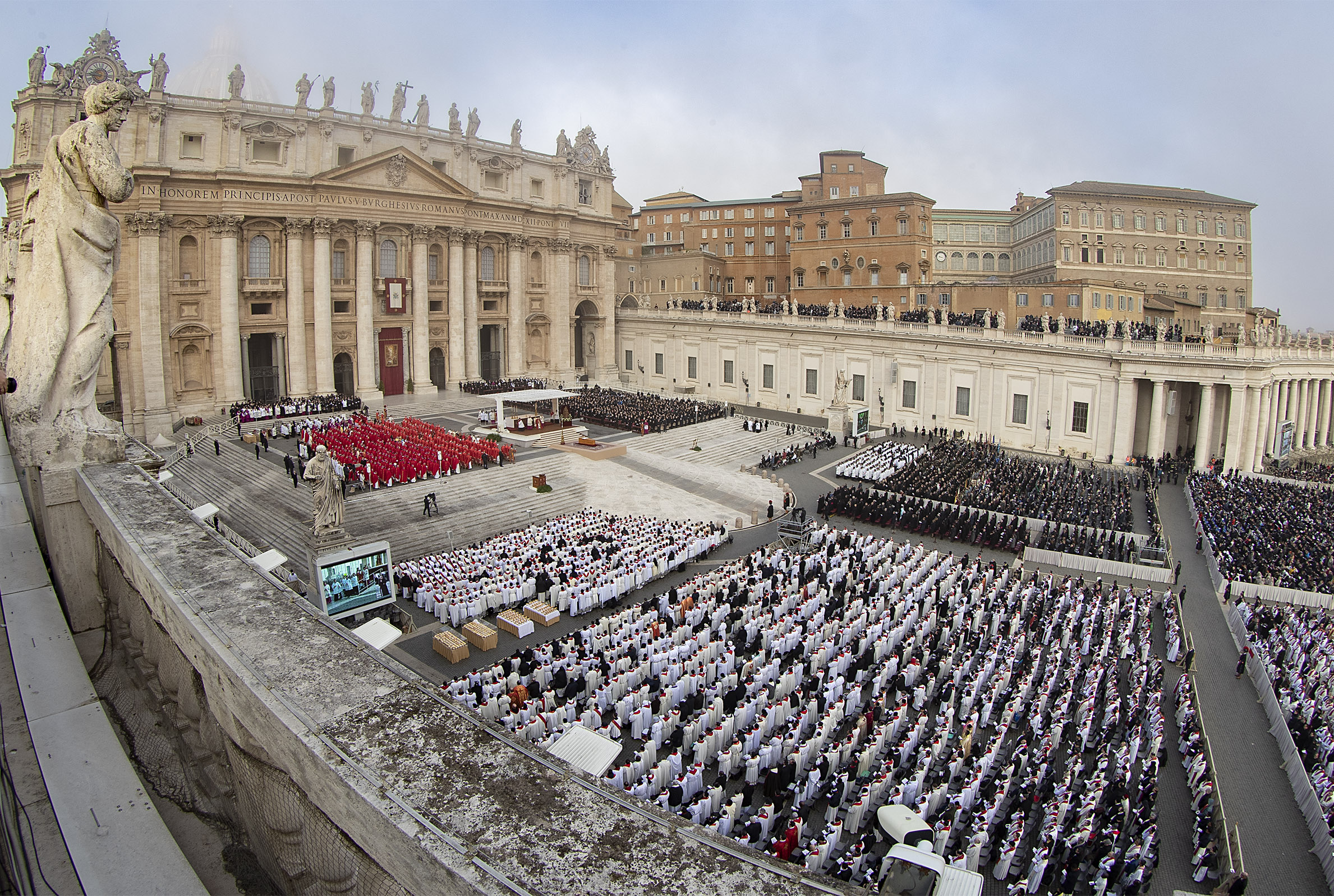
- Top : Body of Pope Benedict XVI lying in state; Left : Pope Francis presiding over the funeral Mass; Right : St. Peter's Square during the funeral Mass
- Date: 31 December 2022 (death); 5 January 2023 (funeral and burial)
- Location: Mater Ecclesiae Monastery, Vatican City (death); St. Peter's Square, Vatican City (funeral); St. Peter's Basilica, Vatican City (burial)
- Participants: Pope Francis, College of Cardinals (led by Cardinal Giovanni Battista Re); Various dignitaries worldwide

On 31 December 2022, at 09:34 CET (UTC+1), former Pope Benedict XVI died at the age of 95 at Mater Ecclesiae Monastery in Vatican City. He had been pope emeritus since his resignation as the leader of the Catholic Church in 2013 due to his declining health. His death and subsequent funeral from 2022 to 2023 ended a nine-year period during which an incumbent pope and a retired pope lived within Vatican City, and ten-year Catholic Church involvement with both the then-current pope and pope-emeritus.

Benedict XVI's body lay in state in St. Peter's Basilica from 2 to 4 January 2023, during which around 195,000 mourners paid their respects. His funeral took place in St. Peter's Square on 5 January and was attended by around 50,000 people, presided over by Pope Francis, whose role as an incumbent pope overseeing the funeral of his predecessor was unprecedented given the order of papal succession.

== Background ==
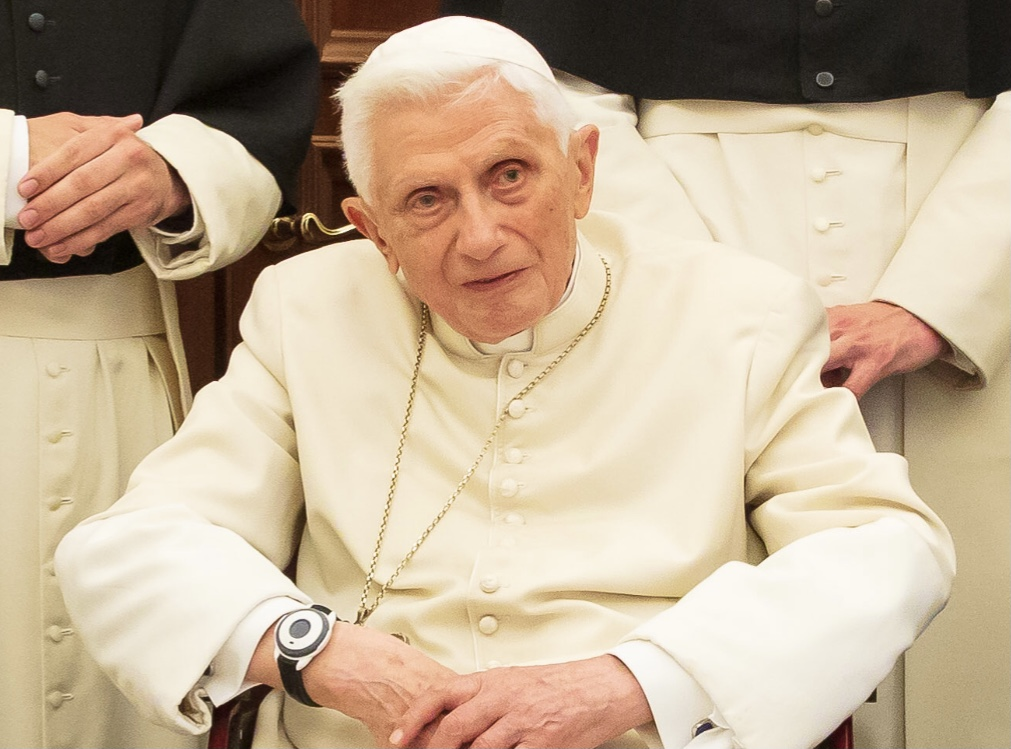
Benedict XVI in August 2019, 3 years before his death

Joseph Alois Ratzinger, then Prefect of the Congregation for the Doctrine of the Faith, was elected Pope Benedict XVI on 19 April 2005, succeeding John Paul II, who died on 2 April 2005. He stepped down as pope at 20:00 (CET) on 28 February 2013, in the first papal renunciation in almost 600 years since Pope Gregory XII in 1415, and the first to voluntarily step down since Pope Celestine V in 1294. He cited his declining health as the reason for his resignation.

In October 2017, a photograph on Facebook showed Benedict with a black eye. He had developed a hematoma after slipping at his residence. Speculation about his health had arisen in the preceding weeks.

In June 2020, Benedict visited his ailing brother Georg Ratzinger in Bavaria, who died shortly after the visit on 1 July.

On 3 August 2020, after speculation in the German press in the wake of a visit by the journalist Peter Seewald on 1 August, Benedict's aides disclosed that he was experiencing inflammation of the trigeminal nerve, but stated that his condition was not serious. Maltese cardinal Mario Grech reported to Vatican News on 2 December 2020 that Benedict was enduring serious difficulties in speaking, reportedly stating to a group of cardinals that "the Lord has taken away my speech in order to let me appreciate silence".

Benedict became the longest-lived pope on 4 September 2020, surpassing Pope Leo XIII, who died in 1903 at the age of 93 years, 4 months and 3 days.

== Last days ==
In his weekly general audience on 28 December 2022, Pope Francis announced that Benedict XVI was "very sick". Francis did not disclose the exact nature of his ailment, but called for people to pray for Benedict XVI. Later that day, Matteo Bruni, the director of the Holy See Press Office, attributed Benedict's illness to old age and reported that he was under medical supervision at the Mater Ecclesiae Monastery in Vatican City, where he had lived since his resignation as pope. Francis visited Benedict XVI after the audience, and Benedict XVI received the Anointing of the Sick.

On 29 December, Bruni reported that Benedict's situation remained grave, but he was "absolutely lucid and alert". The next day, Benedict participated in the celebration of Mass in his room; his condition was stable. The same day, a special Mass was celebrated for Benedict at the Basilica of St. John Lateran in Rome.

=== Death ===
Benedict died at Mater Ecclesiae Monastery on 31 December 2022 at 9:34 a.m. CET (UTC+01), at the age of 95, from cardiogenic shock, resulting from respiratory failure that evolved from a parenchymal insufficiency. Archbishop Georg Gänswein, Benedict's personal secretary and confidant, said that his last words, heard by a nurse, were "Signore ti amo" (Italian for 'Lord, I love you'). On the same day, the Holy See released his spiritual testament, dated 29 August 2006.

On the same day, Pope Francis gave his first words about Benedict since his death, praising him.

== Funeral ==
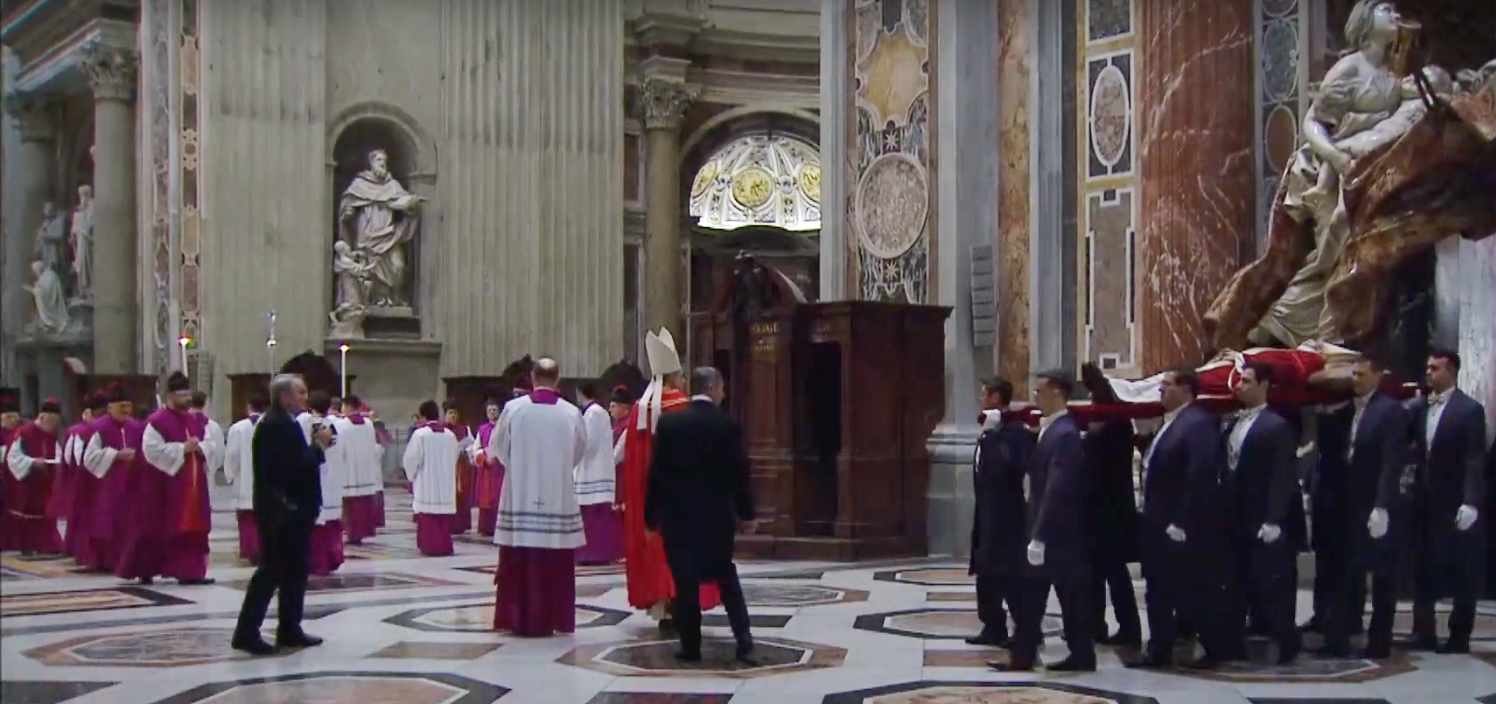
Benedict XVI's body being borne into St. Peter's Basilica by the papal gentlemen on 2 January

At the time of Benedict's death, the Holy See had procedures governing the rituals surrounding papal deaths and funerals, but which were designed specifically for the deaths of incumbent popes. Benedict's funeral was the second and final funeral celebrated according to the first edition of the Ordo Exsequiarum Romani Pontificis, the liturgical book for papal funerals, prior to the creation of a simplified edition in 2024.

On 1 January 2023, Benedict's body was laid in the chapel at the Mater Ecclesiae Monastery, where it was viewed by people closest to him. He was clothed in red vestments, the traditional liturgical colour for papal funerals. Since Benedict was no longer pope, he did not wear the pallium or hold the ferula, symbols of the papal office. In the morning of 2 January, Benedict's body was moved to St. Peter's Basilica, where he lay in state for three days until his funeral. The Holy See stated that approximately 195,000 people paid their respects during the lying in state. On the evening of 4 January, Benedict's face was covered with a white veil. His pallium, coins and medals minted during his reign, and a rogito (Italian for 'deed'; a text summarizing his life and pontificate) were placed in his coffin before it was closed.

=== Funeral Mass ===
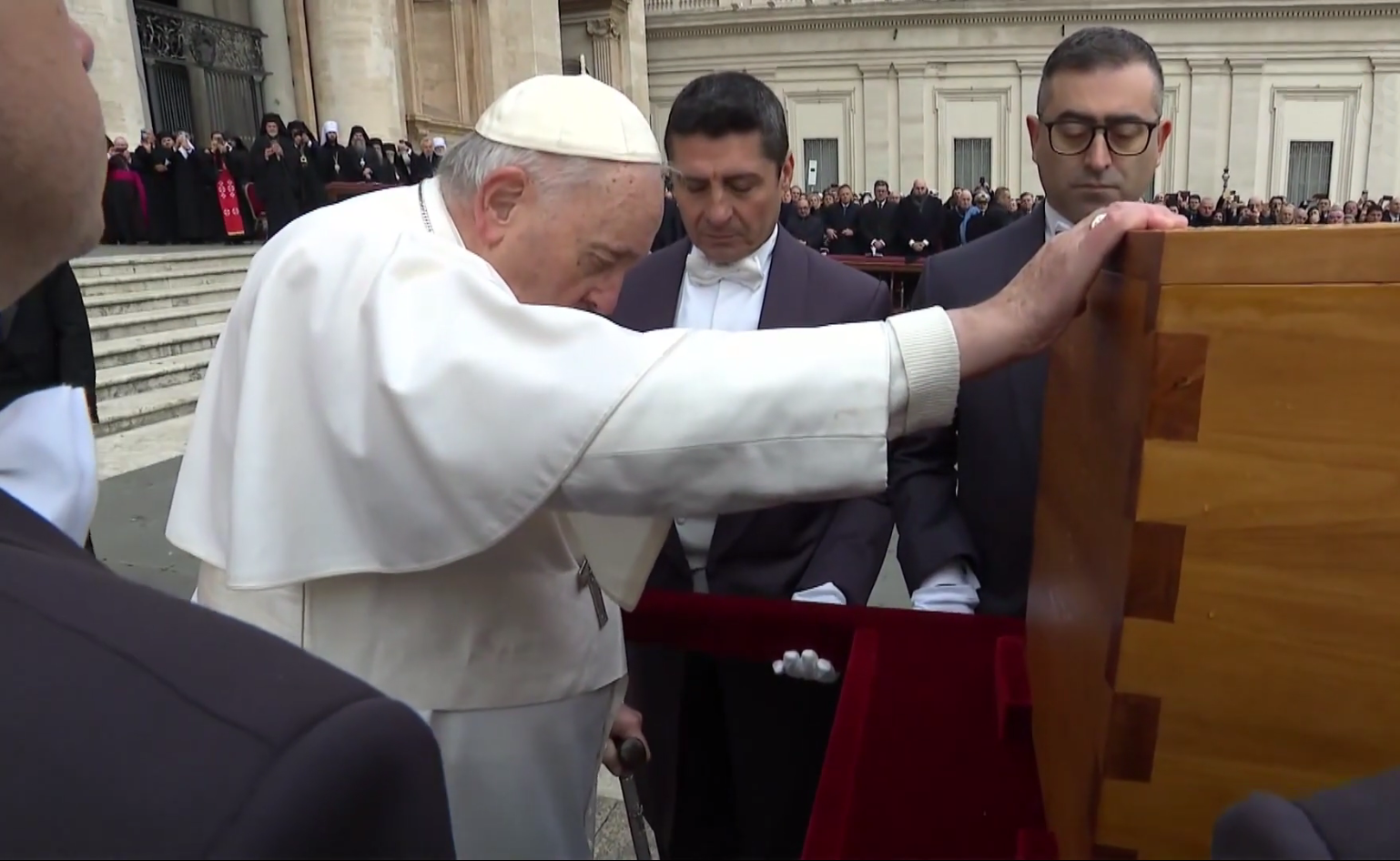
Pope Francis with Benedict XVI's coffin after the funeral

The booklet for Benedict's funeral Mass was released on 3 January. Matteo Bruni, the director of the Holy See Press Office, said the Mass had been adapted from the usual papal burial service, omitting portions applicable to the death of a current pope, and adding other parts. In a departure from previous papal funeral Masses, Eucharistic Prayer III was planned to be used instead of the Roman Canon.

The funeral ceremony took place in St. Peter's Square on 5 January, and began at around 09:30. Pope Francis, Benedict's successor, presided over the service, which was conducted primarily in Latin with prayers and readings also in Italian, Spanish, English, French, Portuguese and Arabic. The Sistine Chapel Choir sang at the service, and Giovanni Battista Re, Dean of the College of Cardinals, celebrated the Eucharist at the altar set up in the Square. The funeral was attended by an estimated 50,000 people. Requests for the rapid canonization of the pontiff – as "santo subito" – were made by the participants. In accordance with Benedict's wishes, his funeral was shorter and simpler than a usual papal funeral.

Francis delivered a short homily during the Mass that focused on the reading from the Gospel, mentioning Benedict briefly such as to praise his "wisdom, tenderness and devotion that he bestowed upon us over the years". Commentators contrasted it to the more effusive homily that Benedict (then Cardinal Ratzinger) gave at Pope John Paul II's funeral.

Before this funeral, the first time a pope had assisted at the funeral of his predecessor occurred in 1802, when a solemn ceremony was celebrated in the presence of Pius VII when the remains of Pius VI, who died in French custody in 1799, were brought to Rome.

=== Burial ===
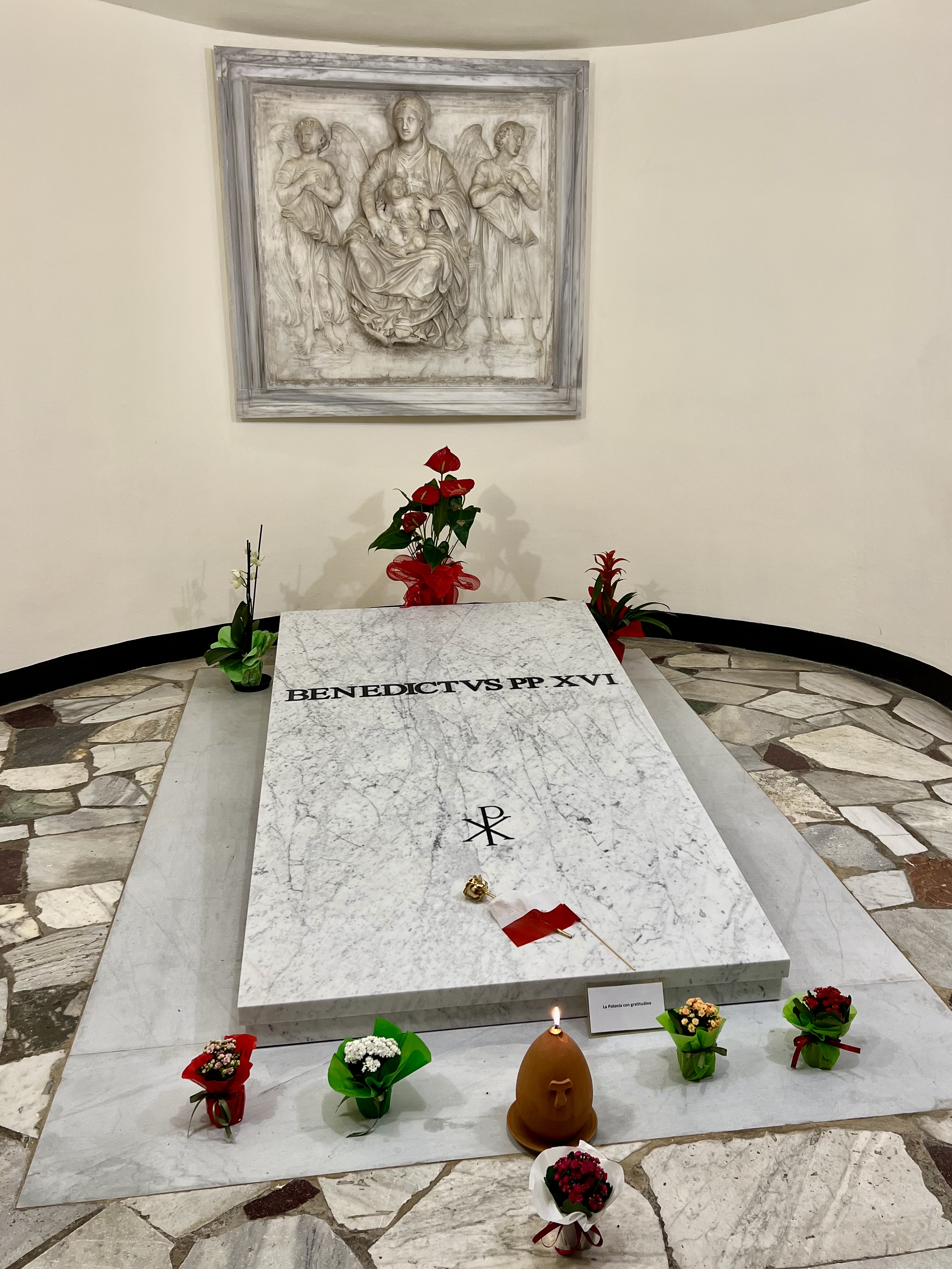
Benedict's tomb underneath St. Peter's Basilica

Immediately after the funeral, Benedict was interred in a private ceremony in the crypt underneath St. Peter's Basilica, in the same tomb that had previously been occupied by Pope John Paul II's body from his death in 2005 until his beatification in 2011. In accordance with tradition, Benedict's cypress coffin was placed inside a zinc one, which was in turn enclosed in an oak outer coffin. The tomb was opened to public visits on 8 January 2023.

=== Dignitaries in attendance ===
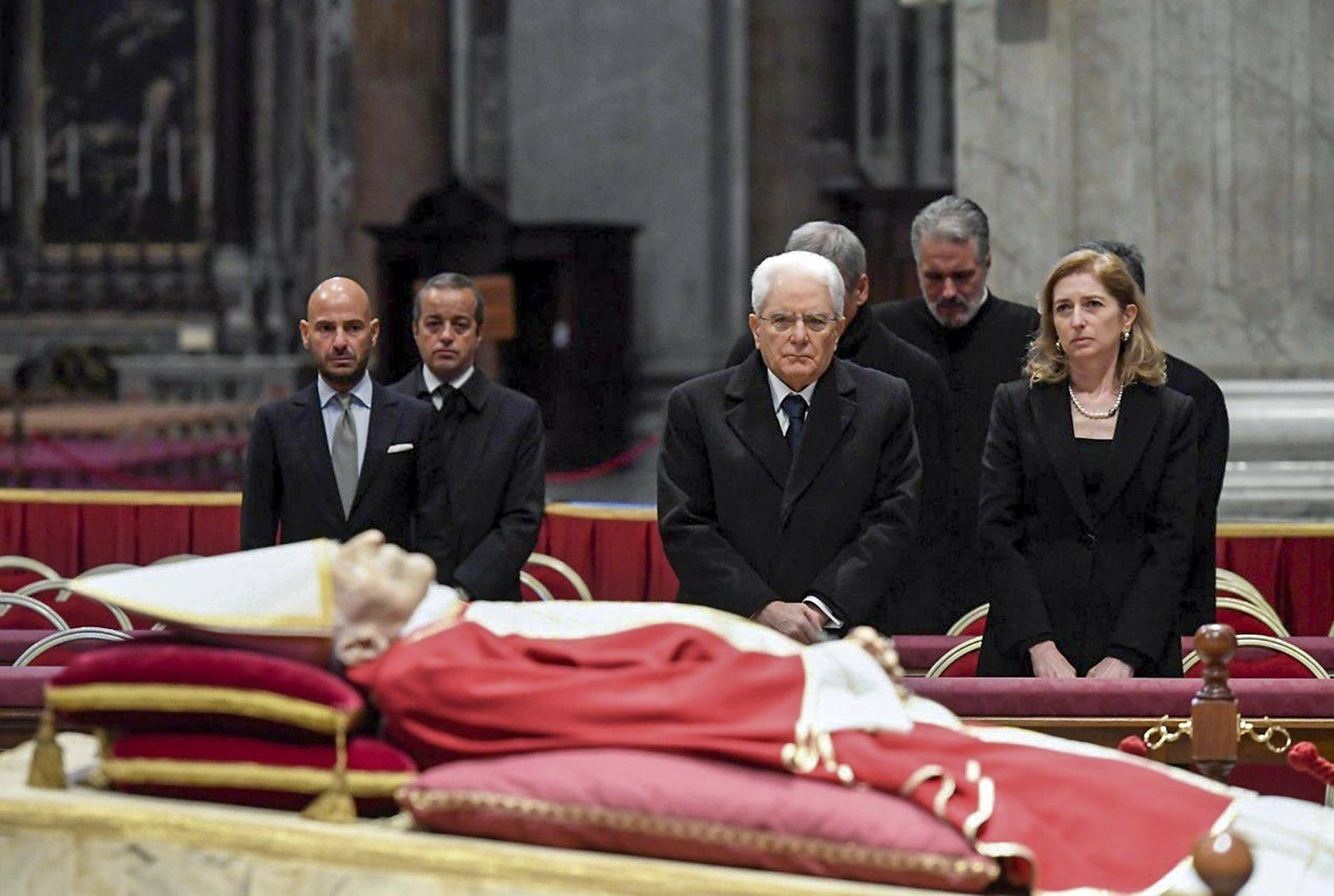
Italian president Sergio Mattarella paying respects at Benedict's lying in state on 2 January

In keeping with Benedict's request for a simple funeral, only the governments of Italy and his native Germany were invited to send official delegations, although representatives from other countries and organisations were able to participate "in a private capacity". Marcelo Rebelo de Sousa, President of Portugal, criticised the decision, saying: "The president of the Republic does not go to these things in a personal capacity, he goes representing the Portuguese State."

==== Italy ====
- Sergio Mattarella, President of Italy
- Giorgia Meloni, Prime Minister of Italy
- Ignazio La Russa, President of the Senate was to come, but had to be replaced due to illness by Maurizio Gasparri, Vice-President of the Senate
- Lorenzo Fontana, President of the Chamber of Deputies
- Silvana Sciarra, President of Constitutional Court
- Antonio Tajani, Minister of Foreign Affairs
- Giancarlo Giorgetti, Minister of Economy and Finance
- Guido Crosetto, Minister of Defence
- Carlo Nordio, Minister of Justice
- Francesco Lollobrigida, Minister of Agriculture, Food Sovereignty and Forests
- Anna Maria Bernini, Minister of University and Research
- Gennaro Sangiuliano, Minister of Culture
- Mario Draghi, former Prime Minister of Italy
- Mario Monti, former Prime Minister of Italy.

==== Germany ====
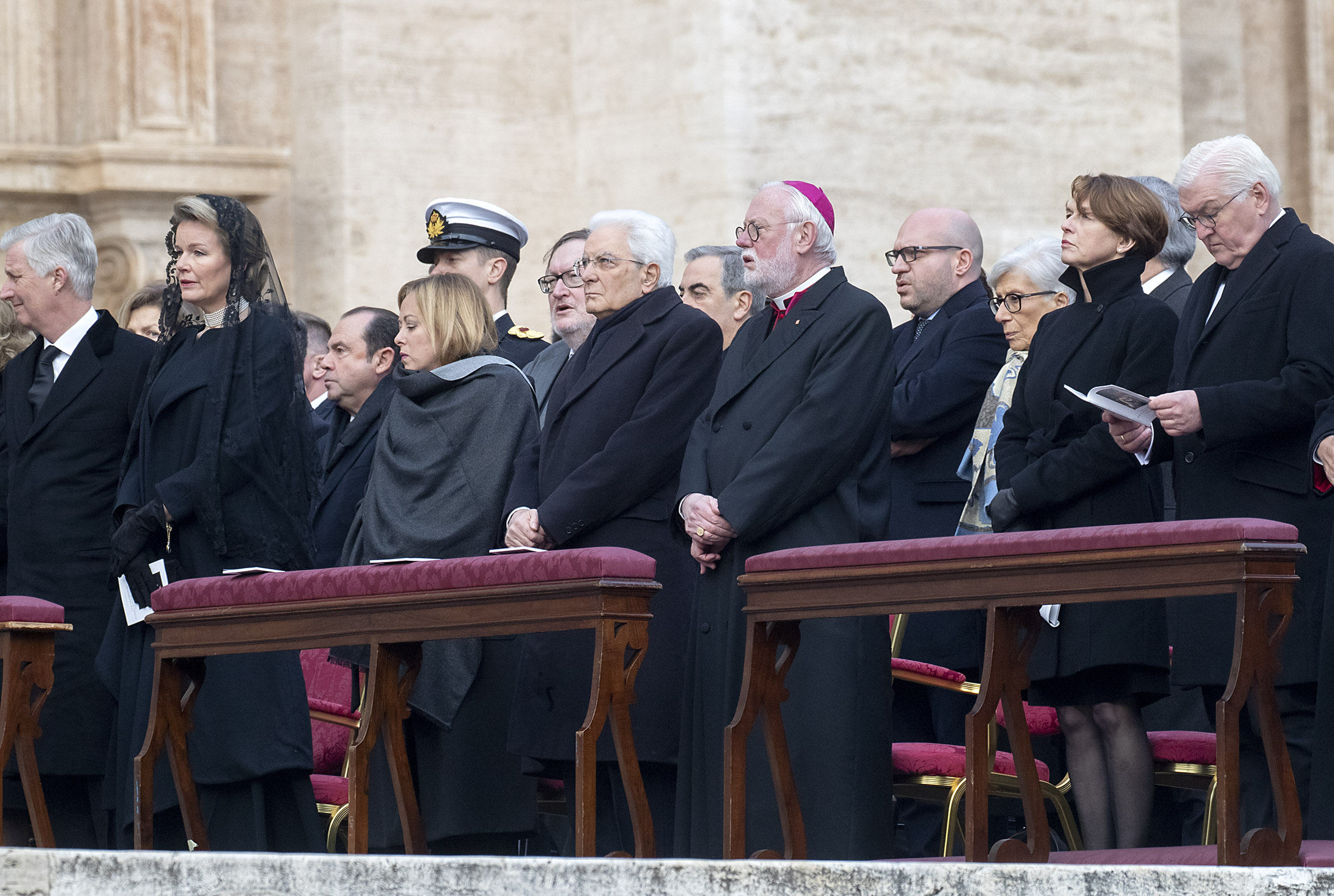
Dignitaries during the funeral from left to right in the front row, King Philippe and Queen Mathilde of Belgium, Giorgia Meloni, Prime Minister of Italy, Sergio Mattarella, President of Italy, Archbishop Paul Gallagher, Secretary for Relations with States, Elke Büdenbender, First Lady of Germany, Frank-Walter Steinmeier, President of Germany.

- Frank-Walter Steinmeier, President of Germany, and First Lady Elke Büdenbender
- Olaf Scholz, Chancellor of Germany
- Bärbel Bas, President of the Bundestag
- Peter Tschentscher, President of the Bundesrat
- Stephan Harbarth, President of the Federal Constitutional Court
- Nancy Faeser, Federal Minister of the Interior and Community
- Friedrich Merz, Leader of the Opposition in the Bundestag
- Markus Söder, Minister-President of Bavaria
- Günther Beckstein, Former Minister-President of Bavaria
- Edmund Stoiber, Former Minister-President of Bavaria
- Hubert Aiwanger, Deputy Minister-President of Bavaria
- Ilse Aigner, President of the Landtag of Bavaria
- Alois Glück, Former President of the Landtag of Bavaria
- Karl Freller, First Vice-President of the Landtag of Bavaria
- Benedikt Dittmann, First Mayor of Marktl, the birthplace of Benedict XVI

==== Other countries ====
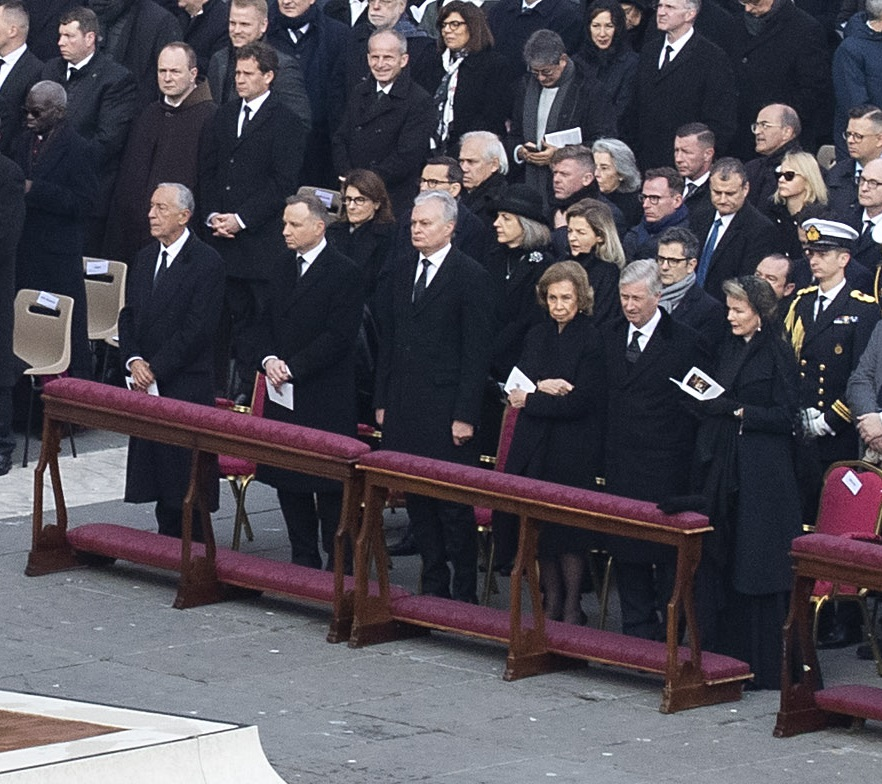
Dignitaries during the funeral, from left to right in the front row, Marcelo Rebelo de Sousa, President of Portugal; Andrzej Duda, President of Poland; Gitanas Nausėda, President of Lithuania; Queen Sofía of Spain; and King Philippe and Queen Mathilde of Belgium.

- Archbishop Joan Enric Vives i Sicília, Co-Prince of Andorra
- Heinz Fischer, former President of Austria
- King Philippe and Queen Mathilde of Belgium
- Chen Chien-jen, former Vice President of China (Note: The Republic of China (ROC) has official diplomatic relations with the Holy See instead of the People's Republic of China (PRC) under the One China policy. The ROC formerly ruled Mainland China and the territory has since been restricted to Taiwan and the other surrounding islands following the conclusion of the Second Chinese Civil War in 1949. See also Political status of Taiwan.) as the president's special envoy
- Ioannis Kasoulidis, Minister of Foreign Affairs of Cyprus
- Petr Fiala, Prime Minister of the Czech Republic
  - Václav Klaus, former President of the Czech Republic
  - Marian Jurečka, Minister of Labour and Social Affairs
- Katalin Novák, President of Hungary
- Frances Collins, Ambassador to the Holy See from Ireland
- Donika Gërvalla-Schwarz, Minister for Foreign Affairs of Kosovo
- Prince Stefan of Liechtenstein, Ambassador to the Holy See (representing his cousin, the Prince of Liechtenstein)
- Gitanas Nausėda, President of Lithuania
- Andrzej Duda, President of Poland
  - Mateusz Morawiecki, Prime Minister of Poland
- Marcelo Rebelo de Sousa, President of Portugal
  - Catarina Sarmento e Castro, Minister of Justice
- Maria Luisa Berti and Manuel Ciavatta, Captains Regent of San Marino.
- Nataša Pirc Musar, President of Slovenia
- Eduard Heger, Prime Minister of Slovakia
- Queen Sofía of Spain (representing her son, Felipe VI of Spain)
  - Félix Bolaños, Minister of the Presidency
  - Isabel Celaá, Ambassador to the Holy See
- Gillian Keegan, Secretary of State for Education (United Kingdom)
- Joe Donnelly, United States Ambassador to the Holy See
- Gérald Darmanin, Minister of the Interior (France)

==== Religious representatives ====
- Archbishop Joan Enric Vives i Sicília, Bishop of Urgell
- John T. Dunlap, Lieutenant of the Grand Master of the Sovereign Military Order of Malta
- Roberto Viazzo, Member of the Sovereign Council of the Order of Malta
- Reinhard Marx, Cardinal and Archbishop of Munich and Freising
- Rainer Maria Woelki, Cardinal and Archbishop of Cologne
- Christoph Schönborn, Cardinal and Archbishop of Vienna
- Juan José Omella, Cardinal and Archbishop of Barcelona
- Carlos Osoro Sierra, Cardinal and Archbishop of Madrid
- Andrew Yeom Soo-jung, Cardinal and Archbishop Emeritus of Seoul
- Jan Graubner, Archbishop of Prague
- Dominik Duka, Cardinal and Archbishop Emeritus of Prague
- Franz Lackner, Archbishop of Salzburg
- Ludwig Schick, Archbishop Emeritus of Bamberg
- Georg Bätzing, Bishop of Limburg and Chairman of the German Bishops' Conference
- Rudolf Voderholzer, Bishop of Regensburg
- Stefan Oster, Bishop of Passau
- Gregor Maria Franz Hanke, Bishop of Eichstätt
- Wilhelm Krautwaschl, Bishop of Graz-Seckau
- Ägidius Zsifkovics, Bishop of Eisenstadt
- Francisco César García Magán, Auxiliary Bishop of Toledo
- Heinrich Bedford-Strohm, Landesbischof of the Evangelical Lutheran Church in Bavaria
- Charlotte Knobloch, President of the Israelitische Kultusgemeinde München und Oberbayern
- Ian Ernest, the Archbishop of Canterbury's Personal Representative to the Holy See
- Ignatius Joseph III Yonan, Patriarch of Antioch and all the East of the Syriacs for the Syriac Catholic Church
- Andrej Ćilerdžić, Bishop of the Serbian Orthodox Eparchy of Austria and Switzerland
- Metropolitan Anthony, Chairman of the Department for External Church Relations of the Moscow Patriarchate
- Eamon Martin, Archbishop of Armagh and Primate of All Ireland
- Dermot Farrell, Archbishop of Dublin and Primate of Ireland
- Diarmuid Martin, Archbishop Emeritus of Dublin and Primate Emeritus of Ireland
- Imam Abd al Wahid Pallavicini, representative of the Comunità Religiosa Islamica Italiana
- Cardinal Joseph Zen, Bishop-Emeritus of the Catholic Diocese of Hong Kong

=== Commemorative stamp ===
On 31 January 2023, to commemorate the death of Benedict XVI, Vatican City released a stamp.

== Reactions ==
=== Statements by country ===
==== Argentina ====
- The Ministry of Foreign Affairs and Worship issued a statement expressing condolences. The Argentine ambassador to Brazil Daniel Scioli called him a "brilliant theologian". Governor of Córdoba Juan Schiaretti expressed condolences and said that Benedict XVI had "sacrificed himself for the Church".

==== Austria ====
- President Alexander Van der Bellen expressed his condolences "on behalf of the Republic and also personally" and stated that Benedict XVI "was connected to Austria in a special way."
- Chancellor Karl Nehammer tweeted: "Together we Catholics mourn for him, Pope Benedict XVI", adding that Benedict was "one of the few German-speaking church leaders" and a "remarkable historical figure".

==== Brazil ====
- On 31 December 2022 the Brazilian Federal Government issued a decree signed by Vice President Mourão as Acting President, while then President Bolsonaro was abroad, decreeing a period of mourning for the death of Pope Benedict, by extending the period of mourning that had been previously decreed on 29 December 2022 due to the death of the legendary Brazilian footballer Edson Arantes do Nascimento, known as Pelé.
- From the United States, President Jair Bolsonaro tweeted his condolences upon the demise of the Pope emeritus, praising the legacy of the late Pontiff. From Brazil, the Social Communications Secretariat of the Presidency of the Republic issued an official statement of condolence on behalf of the Brazilian Government.
- Then President-elect Luiz Inácio Lula da Silva on 31 December 2022 wished "comfort to the faithful and admirers of the Holy Father" and remembered Benedict's pastoral visit to Brazil in 2007.
- On the inauguration of President Luiz Inácio Lula da Silva on 1 January 2023 the Brazilian National Congress, assembled in solemn joint session, observed a minute of silence in memory of Brazilian footballer Pelé and of the late Pope Benedict XVI, prior to the taking of the oaths of office by the new President and Vice-President.

==== Costa Rica ====
- President Rodrigo Chaves declared four days of national mourning to mark Benedict's death.

==== Commonwealth realms ====
- King Charles III, Head of the Commonwealth and Supreme Governor of the Church of England, released a statement saying "I remember with fondness my meeting with His Holiness during my visit to the Vatican in 2009," and "his constant efforts to promote peace and goodwill to all people, and to strengthen the relationship between the global Anglican Communion and the Roman Catholic Church."

===== Australia =====
- Prime Minister Anthony Albanese said that he was "saddened to hear of the passing of Pope Emeritus Benedict XVI, this evening. May he rest in eternal peace."
- Archbishop of Sydney Anthony Fisher said that Benedict XVI "was the gentlest of men, I found this in my several meetings with him. In the end, what mattered to him was being faithful to Jesus Christ and being loving toward Christ's people, and that he did in spades."
- In a statement issued soon after the news broke from the Vatican, the President of the Australian Catholic Bishops Conference (ACBC), Archbishop Timothy Costelloe SDB, said the late German-born Pope will long be remembered fondly in Australia as the Pontiff who led young people from around the globe in prayer at World Youth Day in Sydney in 2008. "From his time as an expert adviser at the Second Vatican Council onwards, there was no question that Joseph Ratzinger was a major figure within the Church around the world, he said. "His papacy will be remembered as one of rich teaching, including his encyclicals on love, hope and truth, as well as his book series Jesus of Nazareth, and for important reforms in areas like liturgy and in the handling of child sexual abuse."

===== Canada =====
- Prime Minister Justin Trudeau said that Benedict XVI "was an accomplished theologian and scholar, and he was an inspiration to millions."
- Leader of the Official Opposition Pierre Poilievre said that Benedict XVI "offered humble service and a wealth of rich theological depth for more than a billion Catholic faithful."
- Bishop Raymond Poisson, President of the Canadian Conference of Catholic Bishops, said Benedict XVI "leaves behind a great legacy of teaching that will continue to inspire us."

===== United Kingdom =====
- Prime Minister Rishi Sunak released a statement, saying that he was "saddened to learn of the death of Pope Emeritus Benedict XVI. He was a great theologian whose UK visit in 2010 was an historic moment for both Catholics and non-Catholics throughout our country."
- Anglican Archbishop of Canterbury Justin Welby released a statement, saying that Pope Benedict XVI "was one of the greatest theologians of his age – committed to the faith of the Church and stalwart in its defence. In all things, not least in his writing and his preaching, he looked to Jesus Christ, the image of the invisible God. It was abundantly clear that Christ was the root of his thought and the basis of his prayer."
- Latin Catholic Archbishop of Westminster Vincent Nichols released a statement, saying that Benedict "will be remembered as one of the great theologians of the 20th century" and that he was "through and through a gentleman, through and through a scholar, through and through a pastor, through and through a man of God."
- Latin Catholic Archbishop of Cardiff Mark O'Toole released a statement, saying that Benedict XVI's "encounter with Jesus Christ gave the whole of his life a new horizon and a definitive direction."
- Ukrainian Greek Catholic Bishop of London Kenneth Nowakowski said "Benedict XVI understood travails of Ukrainian Catholics", adding that the pope had "suffered fascism, lived through the Nazi era, and understood the destruction of our Church under the Communists."

==== Czech Republic ====
- President Miloš Zeman offered his condolences in a letter sent to Pope Francis, remarking that his visit to the country in 2009 was "one of the big moments in the modern history of the country."
- Prime Minister Petr Fiala though social media offered his condolences, stating Benedict XVI was "one of the leading intellectual figures of our time".

==== Denmark ====
- Queen Margrethe II, through the Danish royal family official Instagram account, stated: "We will remember Pope Benedict as a renowned theologian and lifelong servant of the Roman Catholic Church".

==== Fiji ====
- Prime Minister Sitiveni Rabuka wrote a letter to Pope Francis expressing his condolences, stating: "It is with profound sadness that, I convey my deepest sympathies to your good office for the passing of Pope Emeritus Benedict XVI. The thoughts and prayers of all the people of Fiji are with you and the Holy See during this difficult time as we remember his profound ministry and legacy. May his soul rest in peace and his life be an inspiration to all of us."

==== France ====
- President Emmanuel Macron stated: "My thoughts go out to Catholics in France and around the world, who are saddened by the passing of His Holiness Benedict XVI. He worked with soul and mind for a more brotherly world."

==== Germany ====
- President Frank-Walter Steinmeier released a statement, saying that "Germany mourns Pope Benedict XVI and will remember his work."
- Chancellor Olaf Scholz released a statement, saying that "as the 'German' pope, Benedict XVI was a special church leader for many, not just in this country. The world is losing a formative figure of the Catholic Church, a combative personality and a wise theologian."
- Former Chancellor Angela Merkel released a statement, saying that Benedict XVI was "one of the most combative and significant religious thinkers of our time. With this decision [the 2013 resignation], he sent a signal that even the pope had to grapple with the burdens of age."
- Minister-President Markus Söder, the governor of Benedict's birth state Bavaria, released a statement that said "we mourn our Bavarian Pope" and emphasised that with the death of the Pope Emeritus, "society loses a convincing representative of the Catholic Church and one of the most influential theologians of the 20th century." Söder ordered flags at government buildings to be lowered to half-mast and announced that he would travel to the funeral in Rome along with a Bavarian delegation.
- Georg Bätzing, chairman of the German Bishops' Conference, stated he was as "an impressive theologian and experienced shepherd." German bishops "mourn the loss of a personality who gave hope and direction to the Church even in difficult times." On behalf of the German Church "we think of him with gratitude".

==== India ====
- Prime Minister Narendra Modi expressed condolences on Twitter, and said that the pontiff would "be remembered for his rich service to society."
- Chief Minister of Goa Pramod Sawant and Chief Minister of Kerala Pinarayi Vijayan offered condolences on Twitter.
- Archbishop of Bombay Oswald Gracias, in his New Year's Eve letter, said: "I could describe him as the greatest Christian theologian[s] of the 20th century, accepted by Catholics and Protestant theologians alike." He also considered the pope "one of the kindest, gentlest, and humblest of persons." Gracias, who was named a Cardinal by Pope Benedict, would attend the funeral in Rome.
- Archbishop of Goa and Daman Filipe Neri Ferrão said that "Pope Benedict XVI was a towering intellectual, a deeply holy and humble person and a zealous Pastor who was eager to spread the message of the Gospel to the ends of the world." He announced that a Solemn Pontifical Mass would be held at Sé Cathedral on the day of the Pope's funeral, and that the Vatican flag at the Archbishop's residence would be flown at half-mast until then.
- Major Archbishop of the Syro-Malabar Catholic Church George Alencherry praised the Pope for his Biblical knowledge and theological expertise.
- Major Archbishop of the Syro-Malankara Catholic Church Baselios Cleemis said that Benedict XVI's "knowledge, research and experience" provided continuity for the Catholic Church. Both of them would attend the funeral in Rome.

==== Indonesia ====
- President Joko Widodo released a condolences statement responding Benedict XVI death.
- Minister of Religious Affairs Yaqut Cholil Qoumas issued statement, saying that Benedict XVI was "a champion of world peace". He also remembered his religious conservatism to preserve the Catholic Church teaching and his works defending the Catholic faith. He also honoured Benedict XVI for his works to humanity.

==== Ireland ====
- President Michael D. Higgins released a statement, saying that Pope Benedict XVI "will be remembered too for the value he attached to intellectual work and for the personal commitment he gave to such within the Roman Catholic Church, this work being respected by both supporters and critics."
- Taoiseach Leo Varadkar released a statement, saying that he was "saddened this morning to learn the passing of Pope Emeritus Benedict XVI. Leading the Catholic Church for almost a decade, the son of a police officer and a cook, the first German elected as Pope in one thousand years, he was ultimately a 'humble worker in [sic] vineyard of the Lord'."
- Tánaiste Micheál Martin released a statement, saying that Benedict XVI "showed great strength of character and humility in leaving the papacy at a time when by his own analysis, his declining health meant he could not provide the leadership he felt the Church required at the time. He will be remembered for his commitment to global peace including in Northern Ireland and particularly for those of the Catholic faith as a respected theologian and scholar."
- Archbishop of Armagh Eamon Martin released a statement, saying that Benedict XVI "was a person of deep spirituality and prayer, an outstanding apostle of Christ."

==== Israel ====
- Prime Minister Benjamin Netanyahu issued a statement on behalf of all the citizens of Israel sending "deep condolences to the Christian world on the passing of Pope Benedict XVI" and noting that Pope Benedict "was a great spiritual leader who was fully committed to the historic reconciliation between the Catholic Church and the Jewish people, a tradition he continued in his historic visit to Israel in 2009."

==== Italy ====
- President Sergio Mattarella released a statement, saying that Benedict XVI was a "distinguished theologian, brilliant academic and man of extremely fine culture."
- Prime Minister Giorgia Meloni named Benedict XVI "a giant of faith and reason" and that "He has given his life to the service of the world church and spoke to the hearts of the people, and will continue to do so."
- Matteo Zuppi, president of the Episcopal Conference of Italy, stated that "his life was based on love as a reflection of his relationship with God". "In the last part of his existence, he made this relationship with the Lord visible by being silent. We thank the Lord for the gift of his life and his service to the Church: an exemplary testimony to that unceasing search for the face of the Lord, which today at last he can see face to face."
- Head of the Vatican Dicastery for Communications Andrea Tornielli stated "While as the head of the Congregation for the Doctrine of the Faith he was often dismissed as the 'armor cardinal', as pope he spoke constantly about the 'joy of being a Christian'."
- On the day of the funeral, state flags were flown at half-mast on all government, local government and public buildings.

==== Japan ====
- Prime Minister of Japan Fumio Kishida has expressed his condolences on the death of Benedict. The foreign ministry said Kishida also referred to the great contributions Benedict made towards world peace. He said Japan was greatly moved by a message Benedict sent after the 2011 tsunami and Fukushima nuclear disaster, spiritually uplifting the people of Japan.

==== Luxembourg ====
- Grand Duke Henri said that Benedict XVI "tirelessly pursued his mission as pastor and teacher, even after his resignation from the papal throne in 2013."

==== Mexico ====
- The President of Mexico, Andrés Manuel López Obrador, through his official Twitter account stated:"Today, the retired Pope Benedict XVI passed away. Our condolences to the Catholic Church and Catholics, as well as to the Vatican, of which he was Head of State. We also recognize him as a prominent scholar and outstanding theologian. May he rest in peace."; as well, the Secretary of Foreign Affairs of Mexico, Marcelo Ebrard stated: "I am sorry to learn of the passing of Joseph Ratzinger, Pope Emeritus Benedict XVI and Supreme Pontiff of the Holy Roman Church from 2005 to 2013. Our sincere condolences to the Catholic community. May he rest in peace".

==== Netherlands ====
- Prime Minister Mark Rutte stated: "With the death of Pope Benedict XVI, the Roman Catholic Church and all Catholics worldwide lose an important spiritual and intellectual leader. We remember him with respect."

==== Norway ====
- Catholic bishop of Oslo Bernt Ivar Eidsvig called Benedict "the last great theologian of the past 100 years". Eidsvig told Norwegian broadcaster NRK that "He masters all the theological subjects. I cannot think of anyone else who does."

==== Palestine ====
- President Mahmoud Abbas said in a telegram of condolence: "We mourn his death with you, remembering our reception of His Holiness in Bethlehem, the birthplace of Christ, on the day he was a dear guest on the Holy Land in May 2009, carrying a message of love and peace to the world. During his visit, he met Palestinian Islamic and Christian figures in the Noble Sanctuary in our capital Jerusalem, and the Aida Camp for Palestinian refugees, and he expressed his solidarity and support for our people's freedom and independence in their Palestinian state."

==== Paraguay ====
- President Mario Abdo Benítez said on Twitter: "We join the pain on the passing of Pope emeritus Benedict XVI, who left a fruitful legacy and shown in his life that faith, reason, and justice can go in hand. Rest in peace."
- Presidential candidate Efraín Alegre said on Twitter: "Rest in peace Benedict XVI. Pope emeritus, your wisdom and greatness at the Church's front tell us about a great leader and christian. May God and the virgin have you in your great glory."

==== Philippines ====
- President Bongbong Marcos said on Twitter: "We are in deep sorrow upon learning of the passing of Pope Emeritus Benedict XVI today. The Philippines is one in offering our prayers for the eternal repose of his soul. We keep his loved ones in our prayers."
- Bishop of Kalookan Pablo Virgilio David, president of the Catholic Bishops' Conference of the Philippines, labelled the former pope as the "Pope of Charity" whom Filipino bishops "will fondly remember."

==== Poland ====
- President Andrzej Duda said on Twitter: "Pope Benedict XVI has departed to the Home of the Father. Today, the world has lost one of the pre-eminent theologians of the 20th and 21st centuries, a close associate of Saint John Paul II. His life, works and priestly service are a signpost among many winding and deceptive roads of the contemporary world."
- Prime Minister Mateusz Morawiecki said on Facebook: "Today the world has suffered a big loss, but the spiritual and intellectual legacy of Benedict XVI will remain important to us forever. May he rest in peace."

==== Portugal ====
- President Marcelo Rebelo de Sousa in a statement on the website of the Presidency of the Republic. recalled Pope Benedict XVI, "throughout his eight years of Pontificate, Pope Benedict XVI remained a symbol of stability and defense of the values of the Catholic Church: Love of neighbor, Solidarity and support for the poorest and most unprotected and the importance of Forgiveness and Reconciliation", the president also recalled the Apostolic Visit of Pope Benedict XVI to Portugal, in May 2010, on the occasion of the 10th anniversary of the beatification of the Little Shepherds of Fátima, Francisco and Jacinta Marto, not forgetting the words of appreciation then expressed towards our country.
- Prime Minister António Costa recalled on Twitter having received Benedict XVI in Lisbon when he was still Mayor and refers that "his work and dedication will remain a reference for the faithful around the world".
- President of the Assembly of the Republic, Augusto Santos Silva, lamented the death of the Pope emeritus, saying that this "plunges the Catholic Church and its faithful into deep mourning. I pay homage to his memory, highlighting his intellectual stature and the foundational gesture of resignation".
- January 5 was declared a day of national mourning, flags were lowered to half mast.

==== Romania ====
- Margareta, Custodian of the Crown of Romania, sent a personal telegram to Pope Francis and expressed her condolences to Catholics in Romania, Moldova and across the globe.

==== Russia ====
- President Vladimir Putin referred to Benedict XVI as "a prominent religious figure and statesman [and] a staunch defender of traditional Christian values."
- Patriarch Kirill of Moscow emphasised the importance of Benedict's contribution to bearing witness to Christ in a secularised world and defending traditional moral values. He stressed that during the pontificate of Benedict XVI, relations between the Roman Catholic Church and the Russian Orthodox Church "improved considerably, in the spirit of fraternal cooperation".

==== Seychelles ====
- President Wavel Ramkalawan sent a message to Pope Francis, offering condolences to the Holy See and the Sacred College of Cardinals on behalf of the people and government of Seychelles.

==== Singapore ====
- President Halimah Yacob, in her letter to Pope Francis, said she was "deeply saddened" to learn of the passing of the former pope, adding that he will be remembered by the Catholic community for his "selfless contributions to the Catholic faith, championing causes of peace and development".
- Prime Minister Lee Hsien Loong, in his letter to Cardinal Secretary of State of Vatican City, Pietro Parolin, expressed his "deepest condolences" on behalf of the Government of Singapore.

==== South Africa ====
- President Cyril Ramaphosa released a statement, saying that South Africans "reflect with deep regard on the spirit leadership Pope Benedict XVI provided to his Church and humanity more broadly."

==== South Korea ====
- A spokesperson for the ruling People Power Party released a statement, saying that Benedict's "resignation was a symbol of the renovation of the Church and his leading of his life as a pilgrim will be remembered forever."
- A spokesperson for the opposition Democratic Party released a statement, acknowledging "Benedict's special attention to peace and unification of the Korean Peninsula."

==== Spain ====
- King Felipe VI expressed his condolences to Pope Francis, noting that he received the news with "great sadness" and underscored the "fruitful intellectual and spiritual legacy" left by Benedict XVI.
- Prime Minister Pedro Sánchez lamented the death of "a great theologian dedicated to the service of others, justice and peace".
- The president of the Community of Madrid, Isabel Díaz Ayuso, decreed three days of official mourning beginning on 31 December and ending on 2 January.

==== Taiwan (Republic of China) ====
- President Tsai Ing-wen said Benedict XVI will be remembered for his humanity.

==== Thailand ====
- King Vajiralongkorn sent a message of condolence to Pope Francis regarding the death of Benedict XVI. The message read: "Queen Suthida and I are deeply saddened by the demise of His Holiness Pope Emeritus Benedict XVI, the highly venerated and widely admired Pontiff. The people of Thailand can indeed rest assured for certain that we, our country and people, always had a place in his prayers. I myself was proud, then acting on behalf of my august father, His late Majesty King Bhumibol Adulyadej, to receive the late Pontiff's emissary ringing his blessing and good wishes on the 60th Anniversary of His late Majesty's Accession to the Throne in 2006. His late Holiness' compassion, deep faith and spirituality have always been the subject of gratitude and devotion of not only the Catholic community in Thailand, but also across the world. May I respectfully extend, on behalf of the people of Thailand, our heartfelt sympathy and condolences for this very great loss."

==== Ukraine ====
- President Volodymyr Zelenskyy released a statement, expressing his "sincere condolences to Pope Francis, the hierarchy and the faithful of the Catholic Church all over the world on the death of Pope Benedict XVI – an outstanding theologian, intellectual and promoter of universal values."

==== United States ====
- President Joe Biden released a statement, saying that Pope Benedict XVI "will be remembered as a renowned theologian, with a lifetime of devotion to the Church, guided by his principles and faith."
- House Speaker Nancy Pelosi released a statement, saying that Benedict XVI was "a global leader whose devotion, scholarship and hopeful message stirred the hearts of people of all faiths."
- Archbishop of New York Timothy M. Dolan released a statement, saying "the human family grieves the passing of this erudite, wise, and holy man, who spoke the truth with love", also noting that Benedict appointed him as archbishop and named him Cardinal. Dolan indicated that he would attend the funeral in the Vatican.
- President of the United States Conference of Catholic Bishops and Archbishop of the Archdiocese of Military Services Timothy Broglio issued a reflection saying; "The Church gives thanks for the treasured ministry of Pope Benedict XVI".

==== European Union ====
===== European Commission =====
- President Ursula von der Leyen stated she was saddened by his death. "My thoughts go out to all Catholics." She explicitly mentioned his resignation in 2013, which she said "sent a strong signal". "He saw himself first and foremost as a servant to God and his Church."

===== European Parliament =====
- President Roberta Metsola stated "Europe mourns him. May he rest in peace."

==== United Nations ====
- Secretary-General of the United Nations António Guterres has paid tribute to Benedict as "a humble man of prayer and study". Guterres said the late pontiff was "principled in his faith, tireless in his pursuit of peace, and determined in his defence of human rights". He added that Benedict "was a spiritual guide to millions around the world and one of the leading academic theologians of our time". Guterres offered his "deepest condolences to Catholics and others around the world who were inspired by his life of prayer and tenacious commitment to non-violence and peace".

== See also ==
- Death and funeral of Pope John Paul II
- Death and funeral of Pope Francis
