= Resignation of Pope Benedict XVI =

2013 resignation of the pope

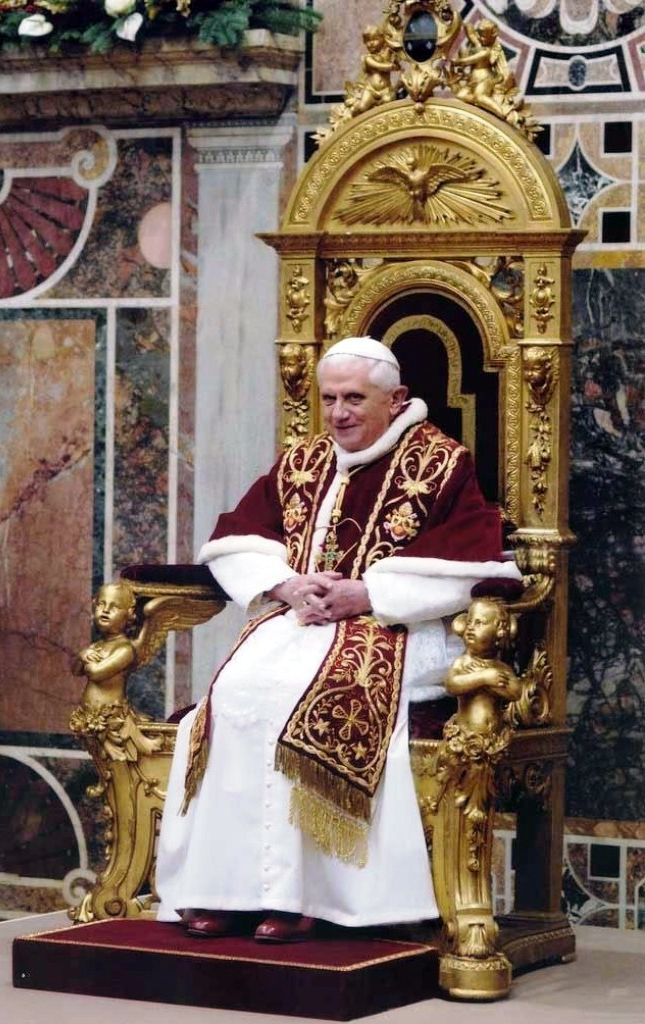
- Pope Benedict XVI in 2011
- Date: 28 February 2013; 13 years ago
- Time: 20:00 (CET)
- Cause: Deteriorating strength due to old age and the physical and mental demands of the papacy
- Outcome: Pope Benedict XVI resigned and became pope emeritus; he died 9 years later in 2022.; Pope Francis was elected in the 2013 conclave.

The resignation of Pope Benedict XVI took effect on 28 February 2013 at 20:00 Roman-Vatican Time, following Benedict XVI's announcement of the same on 11 February. It made him the first pope to relinquish the office (Note: Formally "renounce", from the Latin renuntiet (cf. canon 332 §2, 1983 Code of Canon Law)) since Gregory XII quit the papacy in 1415 to help end the Western Schism.

All other popes in the modern era have held the position from election until death. Benedict resigned at the age of 85, citing declining health due to old age. The conclave to select his successor began on 12 March 2013 and on 13 March 2013 elected cardinal Jorge Mario Bergoglio, Archbishop of Buenos Aires, Argentina, who took the name of Francis.

Benedict chose to be known as "pope emeritus" upon his resignation, and he retained this title until his death in December 2022.

== Announcement ==
On the morning of 11 February 2013—the World Day of the Sick, a Vatican holy day—Pope Benedict XVI announced his intention to resign the Petrine Ministry effective later that month, on 28 February 2013. The announcement was made at the Apostolic Palace, in the Sala del Concistoro, at a public ordinary consistory of cardinals that was being held, as far as most attendees knew, to announce the date of the canonisation of 800 Catholic martyrs. Speaking in Latin, Benedict told mostly surprised cardinals and other attendees that he had made "a decision of great importance for the life of the church". Critically, he noted that the decision was made 'in full freedom' -- that the resignation be voluntary is required by canon law. He cited his deteriorating strength due to old age and the physical and mental demands of the papacy. Pope Benedict was known for being somewhat reserved, and since the demands of the papacy have grown, it may have been too much for him. He also declared that he would continue to serve the Church "through a life dedicated to prayer". The news story was broken by journalist Giovanna Chirri, who understood Latin.

== Final weeks ==
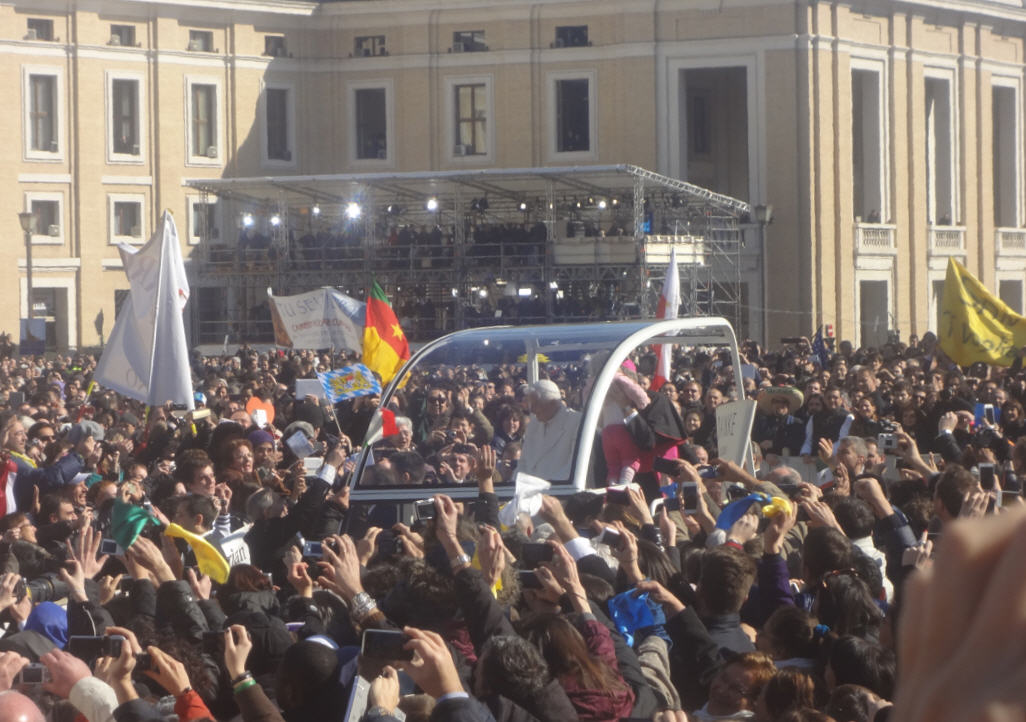
Benedict XVI in the popemobile at final Wednesday General Audience in St. Peter's Square on 27 February 2013

Two days later, he presided over his final public mass: a service for Ash Wednesday that ended with congregants bursting into a "deafening standing ovation that lasted for minutes" while the pontiff departed St. Peter's Basilica. On 17 February 2013, Benedict, speaking in Spanish, requested prayers for himself and the new pope from the crowd in St. Peter's Square.

Benedict XVI delivered his final Angelus on Sunday, 24 February. He told the gathered crowd, who carried flags and thanked the pope, "Thank you for your affection. [I will take up a life of prayer and meditation] to be able to continue serving the church." The pope appeared for the last time in public during his regular Wednesday audience on 27 February 2013. By 16 February, 35,000 people had already registered to attend the audience. On the evening of 27 February there was a candlelight vigil to show support for Pope Benedict XVI at St. Peter's Square.

On his final day as pope, Benedict held an audience with the college of Cardinals, and at 16:15 (4:15 pm) local time he boarded a helicopter and flew to Castel Gandolfo. At about 17:30 (5:30 pm), he addressed the masses from the balcony for the last time as pope. After this speech Benedict waited out the final hours of his papacy; at exactly 20:00 CET (8:00 pm) the see of Rome became vacant.

== Reactions ==
=== National leaders ===
Australia's Prime Minister Julia Gillard, Brazil's President Dilma Rousseff, Canada's Prime Minister Stephen Harper, Germany's Chancellor Angela Merkel, the United Kingdom's Prime Minister David Cameron, and United States' President Barack Obama, each praised Benedict and his pontificate. Italy's Prime Minister Mario Monti and Philippines' President Benigno Aquino III expressed shock and regret, respectively.

=== Religious ===
==== Catholic ====
Cardinal Walter Brandmüller revealed that he initially thought the news of the renunciation was a "carnival joke", according to an interview he gave with the Germany daily newspaper, Bild.

Metropolitan Archbishop of Lagos Alfred Adewale Martins said of the resignation:

We do not have this sort of event happening every day. But at the same time, we know that the Code of Canon Law promulgated in 1983 makes provision for the resignation of the pope, if he becomes incapacitated or, as with Benedict XVI, if he believes he is no longer able to effectively carry out his official functions as head of the Roman Catholic Church due to a decline in his physical ability. This is not the first time that a pope would resign. In fact, we have had not less than three who resigned, including Pope Celestine V in 1294 and Pope Gregory XII in 1415. Pope Benedict XVI was not forced into taking that decision. Like he said in his own words, he acted with "full freedom", being conscious of the deep spiritual implication of his action. ...By his decision, the Holy Father has acted gallantly and as such we must commend and respect his decision.

Cardinal Timothy M. Dolan, the archbishop of New York, said that Benedict "brought a listening heart to victims of sexual abuse by clerics".

One year before the pope's resignation, historian Jon M. Sweeney spoke of Benedict's connection to Celestine V in his book, The Pope Who Quit. He noted how Benedict's comment upon becoming pope, "Pray for me that I may not flee for fear of the wolves", recalled a similar comment made by Celestine. Sweeney also compared and contrasted other aspects of the two popes' personalities and tenures as leader of the church on earth.

==== Jewish ====
A spokesman for Yona Metzger, the Ashkenazi Chief Rabbi of Israel, stated: "During his period there were the best relations ever between the [Catholic] Church and the chief rabbinate, and we hope that this trend will continue. I think [Benedict] deserves a lot of credit for advancing inter-religious links the world over between Judaism, Christianity and Islam." He also said that Metzger wished Benedict XVI "good health and long days."

==== Buddhist ====
Tenzin Gyatso, the 14th Dalai Lama and spiritual head of the Gelug sect of Tibetan Buddhism, expressed sadness over the resignation, while noting "his decision must be realistic, for the greater benefit to concern the people."

== Post-papacy ==
According to Vatican spokesman Federico Lombardi, Benedict would not have the title of cardinal upon his retirement and would not be eligible to hold any office in the Roman Curia. On 26 February 2013, Father Lombardi stated that the pope's style and title after resignation are His Holiness Benedict XVI, Roman Pontiff Emeritus, or Pope Emeritus. In later years, Benedict expressed his desire to be known simply as "Father Benedict" in conversation.

He continued to wear his distinctive white cassock, but now worn without the pellegrina, a traditional symbol of authority (Francis did wear the pellegrina, so this distinguished them when they were seen together). Instead of the red papal shoes, he wore a pair of brown shoes that he received during a state visit to Mexico. Cardinal Camerlengo Tarcisio Bertone defaced the Ring of the Fisherman by chiseling two deep cuts in the shape of a cross, rendering it unusable as a seal. Benedict wore in his retirement a regular ecclesiastical ring.

After his resignation, Benedict took up residence in the Papal Palace of Castel Gandolfo. As the Swiss Guard serves as the personal bodyguard to the pope, their service at Castel Gandolfo ended with Benedict's resignation. The Vatican Gendarmerie ordinarily provides security at the papal summer residence; they became solely responsible for the former pope's personal security. Benedict moved permanently to Vatican City's Mater Ecclesiae on 2 May 2013, a monastery previously used by nuns for stays of up to several years.

Benedict XVI lived in the monastery until his death 9 years later on 31 December 2022. He died there after having been ill for several days. After his funeral on 5 January 2023 in St. Peter's Square, he was buried in a tomb next to his predecessors underneath St. Peter's Basilica.

== Benevacantism and conspiracy theories ==
After his resignation, a number of conspiracy theories started circulating. In one, Pope Benedict was accused of financial mismanagement, and thus the Vatican bank needed to be reformed. In 2012, confidential Vatican documents were leaked, creating issues for the pope of the day. While it is possible that financial or other issues contributed to his resignation, none of them were cited by Benedict as reasons for this own, 'full freedom' decision to resign.

There have been conspiracy theories about the so-called St. Gallen Mafia, which is supposed a group of more theologically and politically liberal bishops and cardinals, and if they conspired to force his resignation or change the direction of Benedict's papacy. Such rumors were widely disbelieved, debunked and disproven.

An uncertain number of people believe that the resignation of Benedict XVI was not valid, and that he therefore never resigned, that Pope Francis was an antipope and Benedict XVI still remained pope. Such a position is called "Benevacantism" (a portmanteau of "Benedict" and "sedevacantism"), "resignationism", or "Beneplenism". Supporters of this position assert that the phrasing or grammar of Benedict XVI's resignation statement, given in Latin, did not effectively remove him from office of the papacy. Benedict himself publicly rejected this theory. After Benedict's death, some former adherents to Benevacantism held to sedevacantism, while others considered Francis to be the pope.

== See also ==
- Vatican leaks scandal
- Death and funeral of Pope Benedict XVI
