= List of pastoral trips made by Pope Benedict XVI =

Map of countries Benedict XVI has visited

During his reign, Pope Benedict XVI made 30 pastoral visits within Italy and 25 foreign trips, visited 25 countries. His most visited countries (outside of Italy) were Spain and his native Germany with three visits each. With an average of three foreign journeys per year from 2006 to 2009, he was as active in visiting other countries as his predecessor, John Paul II, was at the same age from 1999 to 2002. Pope Benedict was more active since then, however, making five foreign journeys each in both 2010 and 2011, significantly more than the six total trips made by Pope John Paul II at the same age in 2003 and 2004. As of the 2012 apostolic journey to Mexico and Cuba, Pope Benedict XVI was older than Pope John Paul II was at the time of his death, as well as being the oldest Pope to travel to Africa, Asia (including the Middle East), and Australia.

Most of these trips involved the Pope giving speeches on issues that play an important role in the region that he visited, especially on education, contraceptives, abortion, and what it means to be Catholic.

== Journeys outside Italy ==
=== 2005 ===
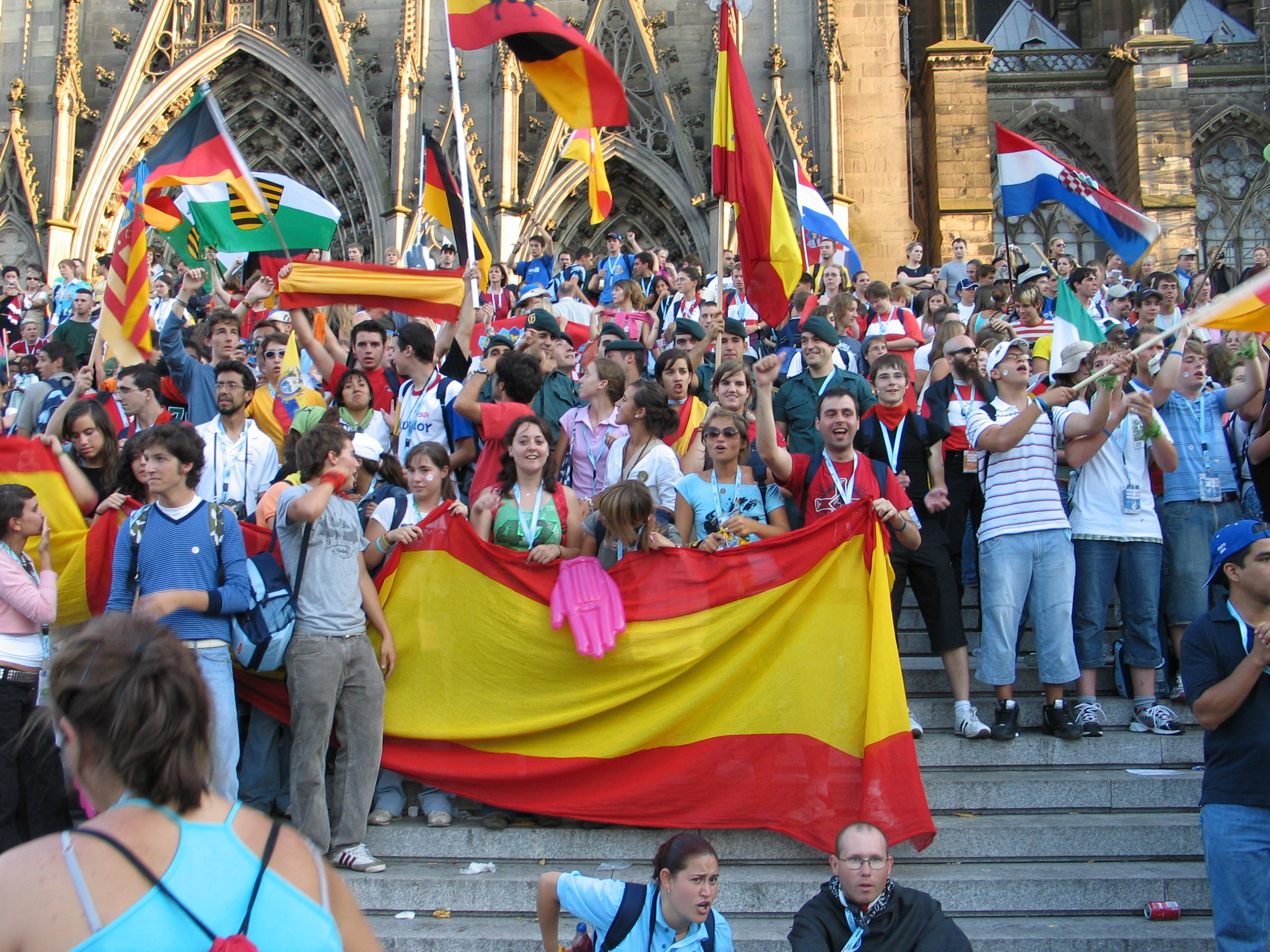
World Youth Day in Cologne

- Germany (18–21 August 2005)

The Pope arrived in Germany on August 18 to participate in the 20th World Youth Day in Cologne. There he met with President Horst Köhler, Chancellor Gerhard Schröder, Leader of the Opposition Angela Merkel and others, and visited the famous Cologne Cathedral. The Pope visited the synagogue of the Jewish community in Cologne, which is the oldest Jewish community in the world north of the Alps. Benedict and his immediate predecessor John Paul II are the only two popes since St. Peter known to have visited a synagogue. He also spoke with representatives of the Muslim and Protestant communities of Cologne. On 21 August, he led a Mass at Marienfeld. The trip was previously scheduled for his predecessor, John Paul II, before his death four months earlier.

=== 2006 ===
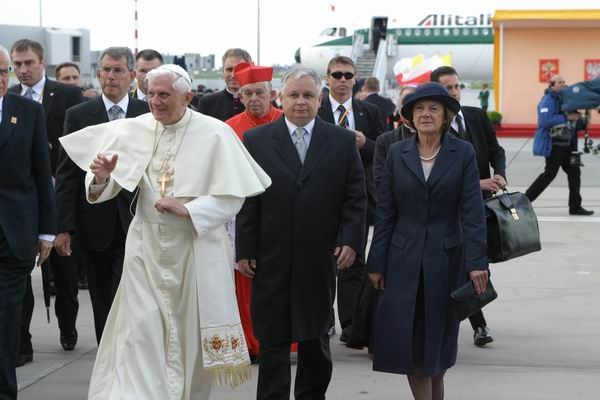
Benedict XVI on his arrival in Poland

- Poland (25–28 May 2006)

The Pope began his visit just after 11 AM on 25 May, landing at the Okęcie Military Airport in Warsaw. Throughout his visit, he often spoke a few sentences of Polish, which he had learned phonetically. After a welcoming ceremony, Benedict rode in his popemobile to St. John's Cathedral, where he met and addressed a thousand clergymen. He also paid an official visit to the Presidential Palace and later that day attended a meeting of leaders of various religions. The Pope celebrated an open-air Mass on Piłsudski Square in Warsaw on 26 May, visited the Jasna Góra Monastery in Częstochowa and arrived in Kraków. On 27 May the pontiff went to Wadowice, the birthplace of his predecessor, the sanctuary in Kalwaria Zebrzydowska, the Shrine of Divine Mercy in Łagiewniki and the Wawel Cathedral and addressed young people gathered at Błonia park in Kraków. On the last day of his visit on Sunday 28 May, Benedict XVI celebrated Mass at Błonia for about 900,000 pilgrims, and later that day prayed at the former Nazi concentration camp Auschwitz-Birkenau.

- Spain (8–9 July 2006)

Pope Benedict visited Spain at the request of King Juan Carlos and the country's Catholic bishops, in particular Valencia, for the Fifth World Meeting of Families. The closing mass was held at the City of Arts and Sciences in the city. The Archbishop of Valencia, Agustín García-Gasco Vicente also presided in the service and made a major address to the Pope and the gathering crowds.

- Germany (9–14 September 2006)

The Pope visited Munich, Altötting, Marktl am Inn, Regensburg and Freising, all in his home state Bavaria. After his arrival Benedict XVI was welcomed at Munich Airport by Chancellor Angela Merkel and President Horst Köhler. In the Popemobile he was driven through the city of Munich where he was the Archbishop from 1977 to 1982. He said a prayer on Marienplatz, the same ritual which he did before he was called to Rome by Pope John Paul II. More than half a million people joined the outdoor masses which were held in Munich and Regensburg. The Pope visited Marktl am Inn where he was born and baptized. He also spent one day with his elder brother, Monsignor Georg Ratzinger. They visited their parents' grave and spent the rest of the day at Benedict's former residence, a house still owned by the pope, in a suburb of Regensburg. Before the return he visited the old bishop's town of Freising where he celebrated a mass with the complete clergy of the Roman Catholic Archdiocese of Munich and Freising in the Freising Cathedral.

- Turkey (28 November – 1 December 2006)

Invited by Bartholomew I, Ecumenical Patriarch of Constantinople to Istanbul, the Pope visited Turkey. His visit to an overwhelmingly Muslim nation two months after his visit to Bavaria, Germany was initially overshadowed by the controversy about a lecture he had given at Regensburg. His visit was met by nationalist and Islamic protesters and was placed under unprecedented security measures.

Arriving on 28 November at Ankara's Esenboğa International Airport, the Pope was welcomed by Prime Minister Recep Tayyip Erdoğan, who was leaving for a NATO summit meeting. Later, Benedict visited the Atatürk mausoleum, met with President Ahmet Necdet Sezer, held talks with Ali Bardakoğlu, President of the Religious Affairs, and received ambassadors at the Vatican Embassy in Ankara.

On 29 November 2006, the Pope visited the House of the Virgin Mary at Selçuk, where he conducted an open-air Mass. At Istanbul, he prayed with Ecumenical Patriarch Bartholomew I at the Patriarchal Church of Saint George, before holding private talks. Benedict has stated that a key goal of his papacy will be healing the long-lasting schism between the Eastern Orthodox and Roman Catholic Churches.

On 30 November 2006, Benedict's attendance at the Saint Andrew's Day's Divine Liturgy, the primary purpose of his long-planned journey, symbolized his seeking of reconciliation between the Western and Eastern rites of Christianity. Giving a message for the unity of the two Churches, both leaders signed a joint declaration. Next, the Pope visited Hagia Sophia, originally the greatest church of Orthodox Christianity subsequently converted into a mosque and a museum. He then visited the Blue Mosque. The Pope then held talks with Patriarch Mesrob II Mutafyan of Constantinople and Patriarchal Vicar Mor Filiksinos Yusuf Çetin, heads of Turkey's Armenian and the Assyrian communities respectively. Benedict also met with Ishak Haleva, Hakham Bashi (Chief Rabbi) of Turkey's Sephardic Jews.

On 1 December, the Pontiff wrapped up his trip by visiting the Roman Catholic Holy Spirit Cathedral. After releasing white doves symbolizing peace and revealing a statue of Pope Benedict XV, he celebrated Mass in the cathedral. In his farewell speech at Istanbul Atatürk Airport, the Pope said "a part of my heart remains in Istanbul".

=== 2007 ===
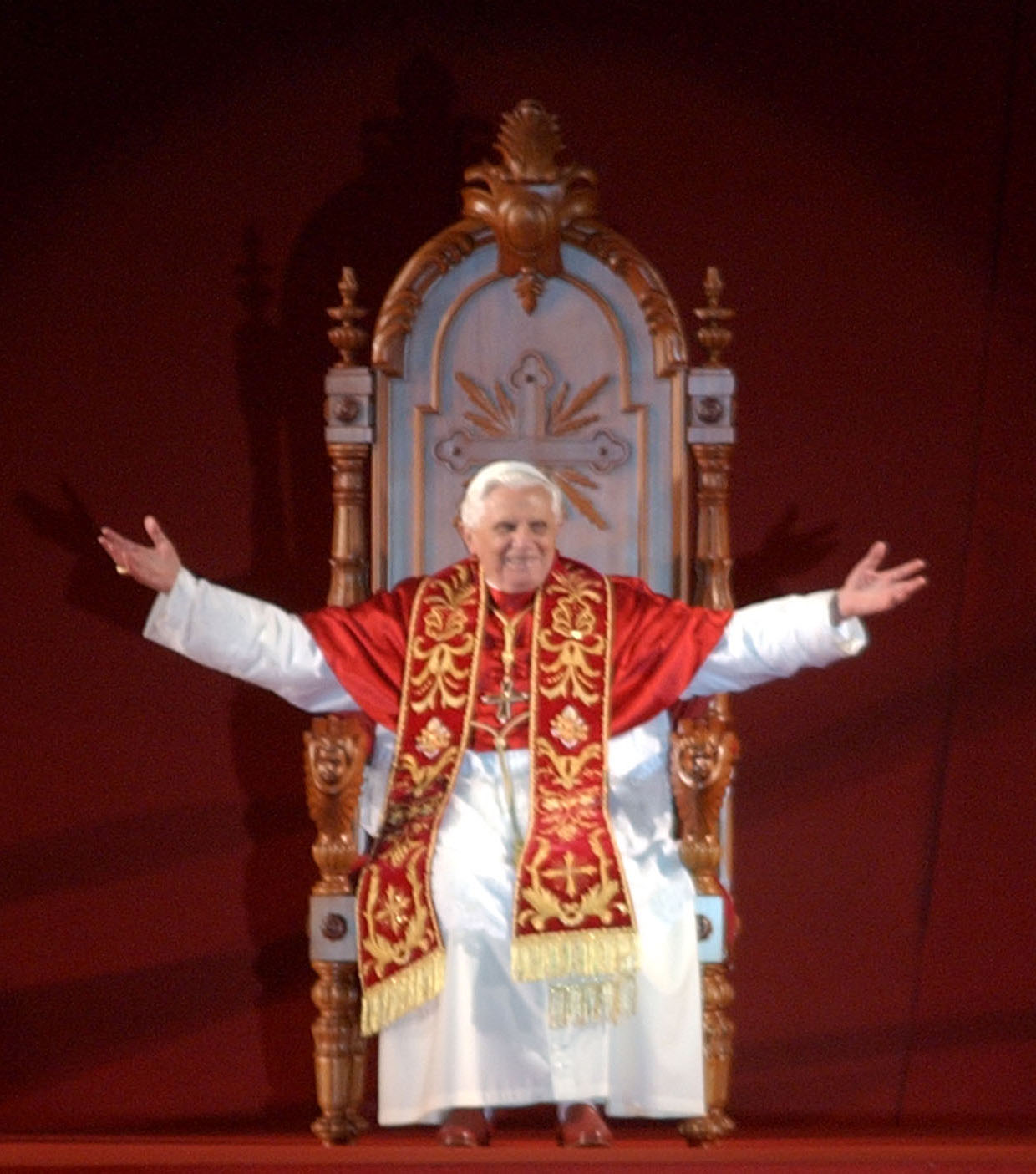
The pope during a meeting with the youth at Pacaembu Stadium in São Paulo, Brazil

- Brazil (9–13 May 2007)

In Brazil, the Pope visited the sanctuary of Aparecida and the city of São Paulo. He used his travel to Brazil to criticize Mexican lawmakers who legalized abortion. However, the Pope made sure that, although he agreed with Bishops who claimed that politicians in Mexico "excommunicated themselves", there would be no formal excommunication of those individuals.
In Aparecida he addressed the Latin American Bishops' Conference. During his speech, the Pope condemned abortion and the use of contraceptives. He also condemned the negatives of capitalism and also Marxism for its destructive effects on economies, government, and religion. He also said that it is important to prevent Catholics from turning to Protestant religions, and to instead reinvigorate their connection to the Catholic Church. Pope Benedict also canonised Friar Antônio Galvão, a Franciscan who lived in the 18th century, at a festive Mass before hundreds of thousands of people in São Paulo.

- Austria (7–9 September 2007)

On 7 September 2007, Pope Benedict arrived at Vienna International Airport at 11:15 AM, where he was greeted by Austria's President Heinz Fischer and Cardinal Archbishop Christoph Schönborn. The visit was labelled as a pilgrimage to Austria's national shrine at Mariazell Basilica. During his three-day visit, he also visited Heiligenkreuz Abbey and joined Vienna's chief rabbi in a memorial to the 65,000 Viennese Jews who perished in Nazi death camps. As a pilgrim, this was his seventh foreign trip in two years.

=== 2008 ===
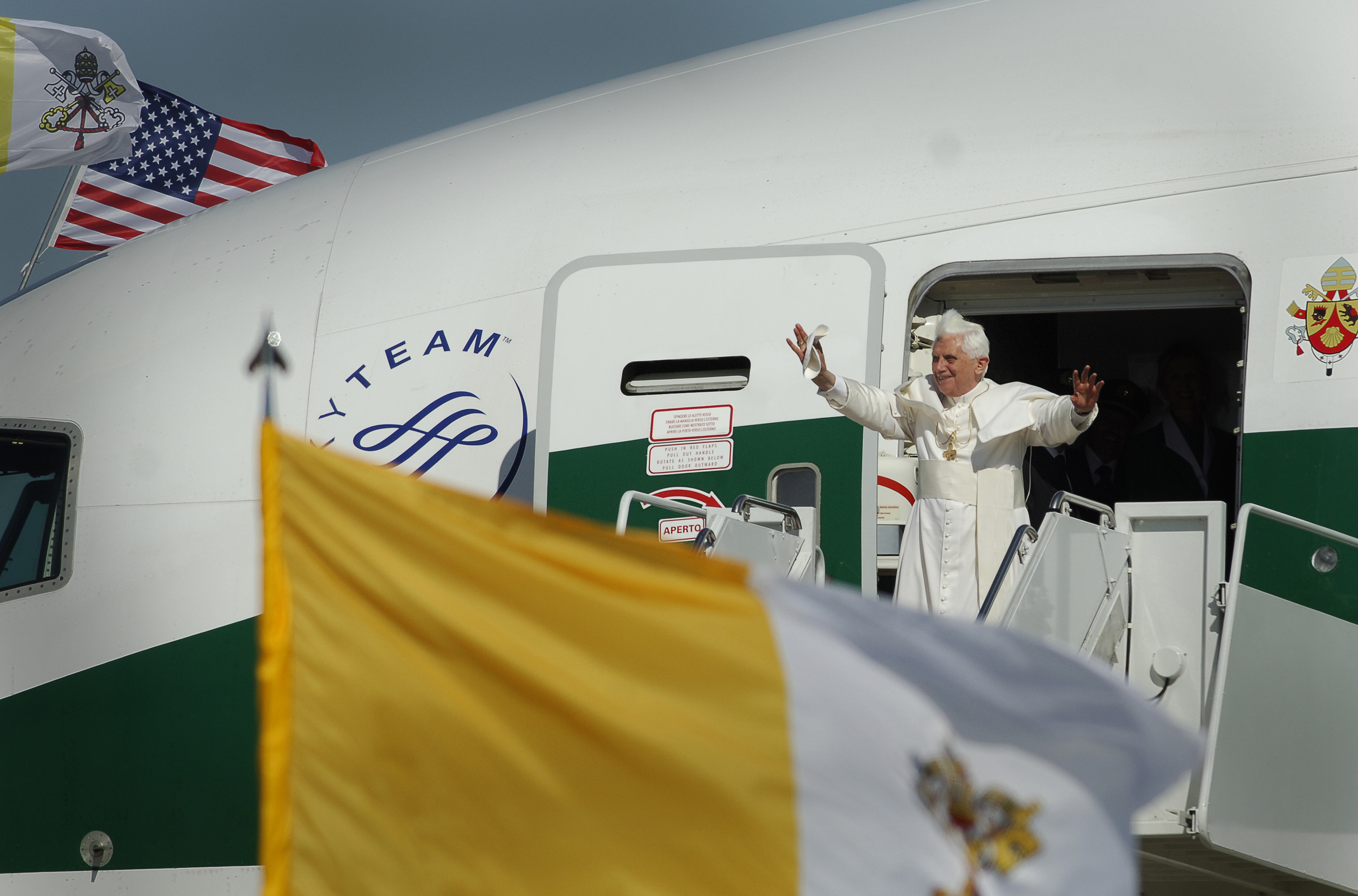
Pope Benedict XVI leaving "Shepherd One" a specially dedicated plane belonging to Alitalia (the flag carrier of Italy) in his visit to the United States

- United States (15–20 April 2008)

The Pope visited the United States from 15–20 April 2008. His journey included meetings with then President George W. Bush, who gave him a small birthday celebration on the White House south lawn, an address to the United Nations General Assembly, Masses at Nationals Park in Washington, D.C. and Yankee Stadium in New York City, and a visit to Ground Zero in New York, among other activities.

- Australia (13–21 July 2008)

The Pope met with the young people of the world at World Youth Day 2008 in Sydney. He celebrated an open-air Closing Mass with the participants at Randwick Racecourse on July 20. To adjust for the time difference, Benedict XVI rested for three days in an undisclosed location in Australia before beginning official engagements.
In Sydney's St. Mary's Cathedral, Pope Benedict XVI made a historic full apology for child sex abuse by court sentenced 107 predatory Catholic priests, inter alia, and clergymen in Australia, on 19 July 2008. Before a 3,400 audience, he called for compensation and demanded punishment for those guilty of the "evil": "Here I would like to pause to acknowledge the shame which we have all felt as a result of the sexual abuse of minors by some clergy and religious in this country. I am deeply sorry for the pain and suffering the victims have endured and I assure them that, as their pastor, I too share in their suffering." The Pope added: "Victims should receive compassion and care, and those responsible for these evils must be brought to justice. These misdeeds, which constitute so grave a betrayal of trust, deserve unequivocal condemnation. I ask all of you to support and assist your bishops, and to work together with them in combating this evil. It is an urgent priority to promote a safer and more wholesome environment, especially for young people."

- France (12–15 September 2008)

Pope Benedict visited Paris, meeting with French President Nicolas Sarkozy, before travelling to Lourdes in Southwest France to mark the 150th anniversary of the apparition of the Blessed Virgin Mary there. At an outdoor Paris Mass attended by 250,000 people, he condemned modern materialism - the world's love of power, possessions and money as a modern-day plague, comparing it to "paganism": "Has not our modern world created its own idols? Has it not imitated, perhaps inadvertently, the pagans of antiquity, by diverting man from his true end, from the joy of living eternally with God? This is a question that all people, if they are honest with themselves, cannot help but ask."

=== 2009 ===
- Cameroon and Angola (17–23 March 2009)

Pope Benedict announced at the closing of a synod of bishops in October 2008 that he would travel to Africa in the spring of 2009. The pope opened a meeting of the African Bishops' Conference in Cameroon. The pope drew criticism for suggesting that condoms were not the answer to Africa's AIDS crisis, but rather, sexual behavior. He then travelled to Angola to celebrate the 500th anniversary of Catholic presence there. During a 21 March mass, the pope urged Catholics to reach out and convert believers in sorcery. During a youth event that day, two women were crushed to death in a stampede.

- Jordan, Israel, and Palestine (8–15 May 2009)

The pope arrived in Amman, Jordan on 8 May, embarking on his tour of Jordan, Israel, and Palestine. During his visit, the pope condemned Holocaust denials, and called for cooperation between the Palestinians and Israelis. After the pope spoke in Jerusalem, Taysir Tamimi, chief of Muslim Sharia courts in the West Bank and Gaza, commandeered the microphone and began to criticize Israel in Arabic. While in Palestine, the pope offered a monumental bas-relief of the Tree of Jesse sculpted by Czesław Dźwigaj for the Church of the Nativity as a gift to the people of Bethlehem.

- Czech Republic (26–28 September 2009)

Pope Benedict XVI accepted an invitation of Czech bishops and the president of the Czech Republic Václav Klaus to visit the country late September 2009 in relation to St Wenceslas Day. He visited Prague, Brno and Stará Boleslav.

=== 2010 ===
- Malta (17–18 April 2010)

Archbishop's Curia in Malta announced on September 12, 2009 that there was a possibility that Pope Benedict XVI would visit Malta the following year in connection with the 1950th anniversary of the Shipwreck of St Paul on the Maltese islands. On 10 February 2010, Archbishop of Malta Paul Cremona confirmed the Pope's visit was scheduled for 17 and 18 April 2010. The main events during the Pope's visit were the Pope's meeting with The President of Malta and other dignitaries at the President's Palace, Valletta. The Pope was greeted by the children gathered in front of the Palace. The Pope visited also St. Paul's grotto in Rabat, Malta. On Sunday the Pope concelebrated Mass on the Floriana Granaries, Floriana, Malta. An unplanned meeting with victims of sex abuse in Malta was scheduled at the Papal Nuncio in Rabat. During the meeting, Pope Benedict XVI was reportedly reduced to tears. In the afternoon, the Pope crossed the Grand Harbour from Kalkara to the Valletta Waterfront, where he had a one-hour meeting with the young generation. During this two-day visit the Pope travelled through various localities around the island.

- Portugal (11–14 May 2010)

The news was announced on the Web site of the Presidency. The statement from the press service of Aníbal Cavaco Silva said that Pope Benedict XVI will visit Portugal next year, "in response to the invitation addressed by the President." The Pope also presided over the religious ceremonies of 13 May at the Marian Sanctuary of Fatima. The number of pilgrims attending the Pope's Mass in Fátima was estimated at 500,000.

- Cyprus (4–6 June 2010)

Pope Benedict XVI was welcomed by President Dimitris Christofias and the Cypriot Orthodox Archbishop Chrysostomos II at Paphos International Airport. Pope Benedict XVI presented bishops of the Middle East with the Instrumentum laborious, or working document, of the Synod on the Middle East, which was opened the following October in the Vatican.

- United Kingdom (16–19 September 2010)

An invitation to visit United Kingdom was extended by Elizabeth II on the advice of Prime Minister Gordon Brown in February 2009. This official invitation makes this the first state visit by a Pope to the United Kingdom.

- Spain (6–7 November 2010)

Pope Benedict XVI visited two cities in Spain in November: Santiago de Compostela on 6 November for the occasion of Jacobeo Holy Year; and Barcelona on 7 November to consecrate Sagrada Família church. The trip was announced the previous March by the archbishops of the two cities, Lluís Cardinal Martínez Sistach of Barcelona and Archbishop Julián Barrio of Santiago.

=== 2011 ===
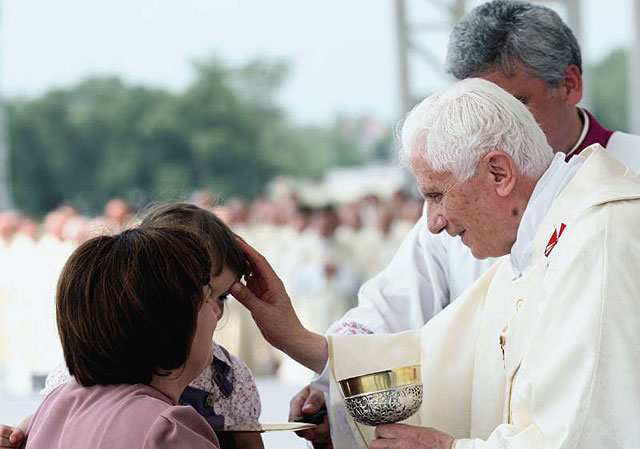
Pope Benedict XVI in Zagreb

- Croatia (4–5 June 2011)

Pope Benedict XVI visited Croatia 4–5 June 2011. He traveled to Zagreb and prayed at the tomb of Blessed Cardinal Aloysius Stepinac. The Pope expressed support for Croatia's bid to join the European Union.

- San Marino (19 June 2011)

The Pope made an apostolic visit to the Diocese of San Marino-Montefeltro in San Marino in June 2011.

- Spain (18–21 August 2011)

Pope Benedict visited Madrid for World Youth Day 2011. He gave a speech during the welcoming ceremony 18 August at Madrid Barajas International Airport. After that, he spoke at the welcoming celebration for his meeting with young people at Madrid's Plaza de Cibeles. More than 100 groups opposed to the Pope's visit protested the financing of it with public money during a time of government budget cuts. The Pope's first event on 19 August was a visit with women religious at the Patio de los Reyes de El Escorial in Madrid. Afterwards, he met with young university professors gathered at the Basilica de San Lorenzo de El Escorial. Later that day, he attended the Way of the Cross with the young people at the Plaza de Cibeles. On 20 August, he celebrated Mass with seminarians at the Cathedral of Santa Maria la Real de la Almudena. Then, he visited the Fundacion Instituto San Jose. The final event of the day was a prayer vigil with young people at Madrid Cuatro Vientos Airport. The next day, 21 August, he celebrated the closing Mass with the Cardinals and Bishops and priests. After the Mass, he recited the Angelus at Madrid Cuatro Vientos Airport, and then will meet with the volunteers at Pavilion 9 of the new Fair of Madrid-IFEMA. Then, he departed Madrid for the Vatican from Madrid Barajas International Airport after giving a speech during the farewell ceremony.

- Germany (22–25 September 2011)

Benedict visited Berlin, along with the Erfurt diocese in eastern Germany and the Freiburg archdiocese in the country's southwest. This was Pope Benedict's first state visit to his native country as Pope, his first visit as Pope to Berlin, and his third visit overall to his native country as Pope. The Pope departed from Rome's Ciampino International Airport at 8:15 AM on Thursday, 22 September, landing at Berlin's Tegel International Airport at 10:30 AM. The welcome ceremony and the courtesy meeting with German President Christian Wulff, took place at Bellevue Castle, the German president's official residence. The Pope then went on to the headquarters of the German Episcopal Conference in Berlin, where he met with German Chancellor Angela Merkel. In the afternoon, Benedict visited and gave a speech to the German Parliament, and then meet with members of the local Jewish community. At 6:30 PM, he celebrated Mass in the Berlin Olympic Stadium. At 9:00 AM on Friday, 23 September, the Pope met with representatives of the Muslim community at the Apostolic Nuncio to Germany's office, before traveling by plane to the city of Erfurt. There, he visited St. Mary's Cathedral, addressed representatives of the Council of the Protestant Church in Germany at St. Augustine's Monastery and participated in an ecumenical celebration. That afternoon he was taken by helicopter to the city of Etzelsbach where at 5:45 PM he was due to preside at Marian Vespers at the Wallfahrtskapelle. Following the celebration he returned to Erfurt. On the morning of Saturday, 24 September, Benedict XVI celebrated Mass at the Erfurt Domplatz before travelling by plane to the city of Freiburg im Breisgau where he made a visit to the local cathedral. During the afternoon he went to the local seminary where he met first with former German Chancellor Helmut Kohl, then with representatives from the various divisions of the Eastern Orthodox Church, followed by the seminarians themselves and finally the Central Committee of German Catholics (ZDK). At 7:00 PM he presided at a Prayer Vigil with young people at the Fair of Freiburg im Breisgau. At 10:00 AM on the following day, Sunday, 25 September, he celebrated Mass and prayed the Angelus at the airport of Freiburg im Breisgau. Following Mass, the Pope had lunch with members of the German Episcopal Conference. At 4:20 PM, he met with magistrates of the German Federal Constitutional Court, then with a group of Catholics active in the Church and society. Following the departure ceremony at Flughafen Lahr, the papal plane departed for the Vatican; it was expected to land at Ciampino International Airport at 8:45 PM.

- Benin (18–20 November 2011)

Benedict XVI visited Benin at the invitation of the Government and bishops of this country. On the second day of his visit to Benin, the Pope travelled to Ouidah where he called for respect for traditional beliefs. The Pope called for reconciliation at a Mass held in the Friendship Stadium in Cotonou on the final day of the trip.

=== 2012 ===
- Mexico and Cuba (23–29 March 2012)

The Pope arrived in Mexico in the city of León, Guanajuato at 4:12 PM CST (UTC−6) on Friday, 23 March 2012 and was received by a crowd of about 4,000 people. President Calderón and first lady Margarita Zavala officially welcomed the Pope during the reception ceremony. President Calderón gave a welcoming speech and minutes later the Pope took the podium. The Pope was scheduled to be in Mexico from Friday, 23 March to Monday, 26 March. During his three-day visit, the Pope stayed in a one-story guest house annexed to a K-12 Catholic school, Colegio Miraflores.
Upon his departure from Mexico, the Pope visited the cities of Santiago de Cuba and Havana in Cuba from Monday, 26 March to Thursday, 29 March 2012. The Pope stated on his visit, regarding Cuba, Marxism "no longer responds to reality".

- Lebanon (14–16 September 2012)

The Pope visited Lebanon to promulgate his post-Synodal Apostolic Exhortation at Harissa, Lebanon following the Synod on the Middle East, held in 2010. He met with political leaders of the country and religious leaders of the Muslim community at Baabda. During his stay the pope also visited the settlements of Bzommar and Bkerké, holding meetings with Patriarchs and Bishops of Lebanon and the youth.

=== 2020 (as Pope Emeritus) ===
- Germany (18-22 June 2020)

Benedict XVI, as Pope Emeritus, made one personal trip outside of Italy on June 2020 to visit his elder brother Georg in Regensburg, who at the time was 96 years old and in poor health. He was accompanied by his personal secretary, Georg Gänswein, one doctor, one nurse, one member from the Memores Domini community, and the vice commander of the Vatican Gendarmerie. Italian news reported that Pope Francis was consulted before Benedict made the decision to visit his brother. Francis also visited Benedict XVI at the Mater Ecclesiae Monastery before the latter left for Germany. The Diocese of Regensburg announced on its website that no photos, public appearances, or meetings would be held during his visit, and asked the public to keep the encounter private.

During his trip to Germany, he resided in the seminary of the Diocese of Regensburg. Bishop Rudolf Voderholzer said that Mass was being offered daily at Georg's bedside during Benedict's visit. He also paid a visit to his deceased parents and sister at the Ziegendorf cemetery. He also paid visit to his old home in Pentling, where he worked as professor before his appointment as Archbishop of Munich and Freising. He also met with the Apostolic Nuncio to Germany, Nikola Eterović, who served as Secretary General of the Synod of Bishops during Benedict's pontificate, before returning to Rome.

Georg died on 1 July 2020, more than a week after Benedict visited him.

== Journeys in Italy ==
=== 2005 ===
- 28 May: Bari

On his first official trip as Supreme Pontiff, the Pope visited the Italian port of Bari on the day of Corpus Christi to close the Italian National Eucharistic Congress and hold a meeting of reconciliation with the Eastern Orthodox Church. This meeting was held in a city related to the Orthodox Church: Bari, located on the Italian Adriatic coast, which is considered a "bridge" between East and West and is home to the relics of St. Nicholas of Myra, a saint of the century fourth and the prototype of Santa Claus, who is also one of the most popular saints in the Catholic and Orthodox Churches. The Pope referred to Bari as a "land of encounter and dialogue" with the Orthodox Church in his homily at the Mass. It was the first trip out of Rome since he was elected the 265th leader of the Catholic Church on 19 April 2005.

=== 2006 ===
- 1 September: Sanctuary of Manoppello
- 19 October: Verona

On the occasion of the IV National Ecclesiastical Congress of the Italian Church.

=== 2007 ===
- 21–22 April: Vigévano and Pavia
- 17 June: Assisi

On the occasion of the VIII Centenary of the Conversion of Saint Francis

- 1–2 September: Sanctuary of Loreto

On the occasion of the Agora of the young Italians

- 23 September: Velletri
- 21 October: Naples

=== 2008 ===
- 17–18 May: Savona and Genoa
- 14–15 June: Santa María di Leuca and Brindisi
- 17 September: Sardinia

To conclude in Cagliari the celebrations of the first centenary of the proclamation of the Virgin of Bonaria as patron saint of the island.

- 19 October: Sanctuary of Our Lady of the Holy Rosary of Pompeii

=== 2009 ===
- 28 April: Areas of Abruzzo affected by the earthquake
- 24 May: Cassino and Montecassino
- 21 June: San Giovanni Rotondo
- 6 September: Viterbo and Bagnoregio
- 8 November: Brescia and Concesio

=== 2010 ===
- 2 April: Turin

Benedict XVI went to Turin for the ostension of the Holy Shroud

- 4 July: Sulmona

The Pope visited this Italian city on the occasion of the 8th centenary of the birth of Pope Celestine V.

- 5 September: Carpineto Romano

Benedict XVI traveled there on the occasion of the II centenary of the birth of Pope Leo XIII.

- 3 October: Palermo

On the occasion of the Regional Meeting of Families and Youth. The visit had three major events: a Mass at the Foro Italico in Palermo, an encounter with priests, men and women religious and seminarians in the Cathedral and the meeting with young people in Plaza Politeama.

=== 2011 ===
- 7–8 May: Aquileia and Venice
- 19 June: Diocese of San Marino-Montefeltro
- 11 September: Ancona

The occasion of the visit is the conclusion of the 25th National Eucharistic Congress of Italy.

- 9 October: Lamezia Terme and Serra
- 27 October: Assisi

=== 2012 ===
- 13 May: Arezzo, La Verna and Sansepolcro
- 1–3 June: Milan and Bresso

On the occasion of the VII World Meeting of Families

- 26 June: Areas affected by the Emilia-Romagna earthquake
- 4 October: Loreto

== Previously confirmed journeys ==
- Slovenia, Croatia, Bosnia and Herzegovina, Serbia and Kosovo (June 6 to June 13, 2013)

The Pope was scheduled to travel to Brazil for World Youth Day 2013 in Rio de Janeiro, until his resignation on 28 February. This journey was made by his successor Pope Francis.

- Croatia (14–16 September 2018)

The Pope was scheduled to travel to Croatia for 3rd National Meeting of Families in Split and Solin.

== See also ==
- List of pastoral visits of Pope Paul VI
- List of pastoral visits of Pope John Paul II
- List of pastoral visits of Pope Francis
- List of pastoral visits of Pope Leo XIV
- Papal travel
