= Pope emeritus =

Pope who has resigned

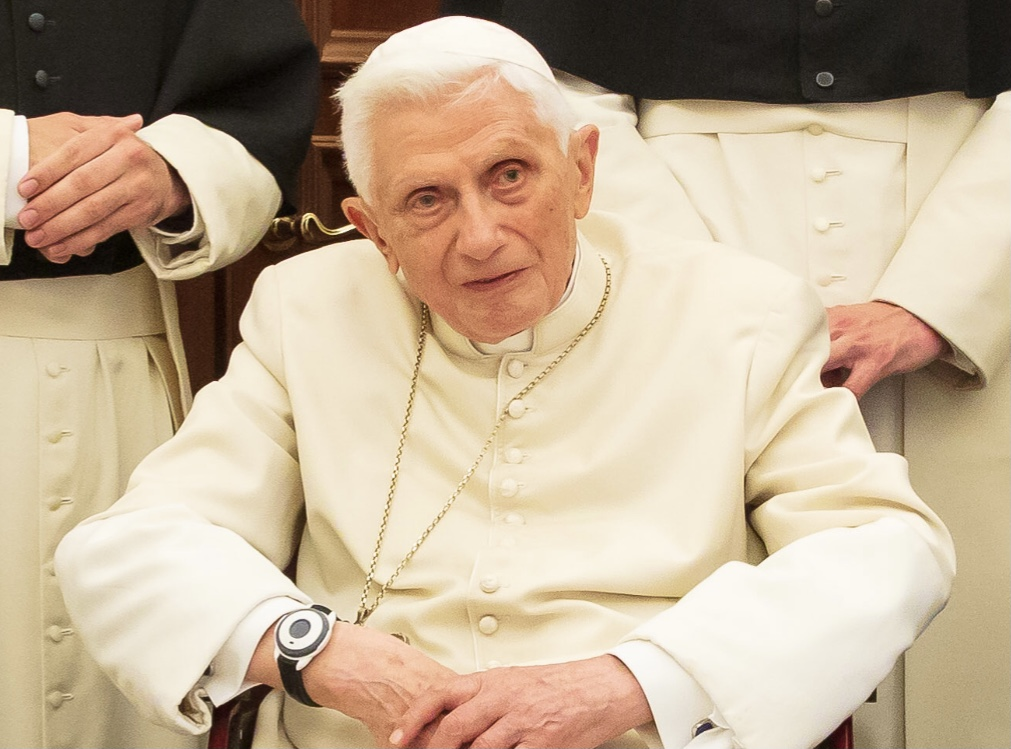
Pope Benedict XVI in August 2019, pope emeritus from 28 February 2013 until his death on 31 December 2022.

Pope emeritus, also known as supreme pontiff emeritus, is the title adopted by Pope Benedict XVI following his resignation from the papacy. The title took effect on 28 February 2013, at the beginning of the sede vacante period.

The title is not explicitly mentioned in the canon law; however, it provides for a pontiff resigning from office. Benedict XVI, the first and currently the only pope of the contemporary era to resign, was the only pontiff to have held this title following his resignation.

== Insignia and title ==
Comparison between papal dress (left) and pope emeritus dress (right)

The insignia of the pope emeritus differ from those of a reigning pope:

- the white cassock remains unchanged, but the pellegrina and the fascia are not prescribed;
- the Ring of the Fisherman, which is cancelled at the beginning of the sede vacante period, is replaced by the episcopal ring;
- the traditional red shoes are not prescribed.

The papal name, the style (which, as with a reigning pope, may be Holy Father or His Holiness) remain unchanged. Benedict XVI also retained his coat of arms at his express wish.

== Canonical status and regulations ==
Canon 332 §2 of the Code of Canon Law (CIC) states that "if it happens that the Roman Pontiff resigns his office, it is required for validity that the resignation is made freely and properly manifested but not that it is accepted by anyone". Although he was not the first pope to resign, Benedict XVI was the first to do so under the provisions of the code of canon law promulgated in 1983.

=== Emeritus status in canon law ===
The emeritus status is a legal institution provided for by the Code of Canon Law promulgated in 1983. According to canon 185 of the CIC, the title of emeritus "can be conferred upon a person who loses an office by reason of age or of resignation which has been accepted". However, this status is not explicitly provided for in the case of the papal office.

The title of "pope emeritus" was preferred to that of "bishop emeritus of Rome" in order to clearly distinguish the papal office from that of other bishops.

Canon-law doctrine unanimously holds that a Roman pontiff who has resigned his office does not, under any circumstances, return to the College of Cardinals (this would be possible only if he were appointed a cardinal again, as in the case of Gregory XII).

The title and legal status of "pope emeritus" are not, therefore, provided for by law. Their adoption represents a legal innovation that has given rise to differing opinions.

== Theological and canonical debate ==
The choice has been the subject of debate among Catholic theologians and canonists. A few days after the resignation of Pope Benedict XVI, Manuel Jesús Arroba, a professor of canon law at the Pontifical Lateran University, affirmed that "there's only one pope legally; a 'pope emeritus' cannot exist".

In March 2013, Gianfranco Ghirlanda, former rector of the Pontifical Gregorian University and professor of canon law at the same university, expressed the same view in a lengthy article published in La Civiltà Cattolica, concluding that "he who ceases from the pontifical ministry for a reason other than death, while evidently remaining bishop, is no longer pope, since he loses all primatial power, as the power did not come from episcopal ordination, but directly from Christ through the acceptance of the legitimate election".

Stefano Violi, a professor of canon law at the Theological Faculty of Emilia-Romagna (it) and the Faculty of Theology of Lugano (de), holds an opposite position. In his view, Benedict XVI's resignation did not constitute a renunciation of the munus petrinum (Petrine office) (Note: The office of "head of the Church", entrusted to Saint Peter and transmitted to his successors.) itself, but only of its exercise:

Through an act of freedom, Benedict XVI exercised the fullness of his ministry, relinquishing all the powers associated with his office for the good of the Church, while not abandoning his service to the Church. His service continues through the exercise of the most eminent spiritual dimension inherent in the munus entrusted to him, which he did not intend to renounce.

Thus, according to this view, Pope Benedict XVI would have renounced the direct and active exercise of the "Petrine office", but not the ministry itself, which, according to this view, is irrevocable. This would explain, in Vittorio Messori's view, the choice of the title "pope emeritus".

During the in-flight press conference on the return flight from South Korea to Rome, Pope Francis commented on the choice of the title of "pope emeritus", stating:

I think that a Pope emeritus should not be an exception; after so many centuries, this is our first Pope emeritus. As he put it: "I’ve grown old, I don’t have the strength". It was a fine gesture, noble yet also humble and courageous. My thinking is that seventy years ago bishops emeritus were an exception; they didn’t exist. Today bishops emeritus are an institution. I think that a "Pope emeritus" has already become an institution. Why? Because our span of life increases and at a certain age we no longer have the ability to govern well because our body is weary; our health may be good but we don’t have the ability to deal with all the problems of a government like that of the Church. I believe that Pope Benedict XVI took this step which de facto instituted Popes emeriti. I repeat, perhaps some theologian will tell you that it isn’t right, but that’s what I think. Time will tell if it is right or wrong, we shall see. [...] [Benedict] opened a door which is institutional, not exceptional.

In 2018, Benedict XVI told his biographer, Peter Seewald, that the emeritus papacy was a "juridical-spiritual form that precludes any thought of two popes coexisting: a bishopric can have only one incumbent. At the same time, it expresses a spiritual bond that cannot be severed in any way".

== See also ==
- Pope
- Papal renunciation
- Resignation of Pope Benedict XVI
