= Mater Ecclesiae Monastery =

Monastery in Vatican City

- Monastero Mater Ecclesiae
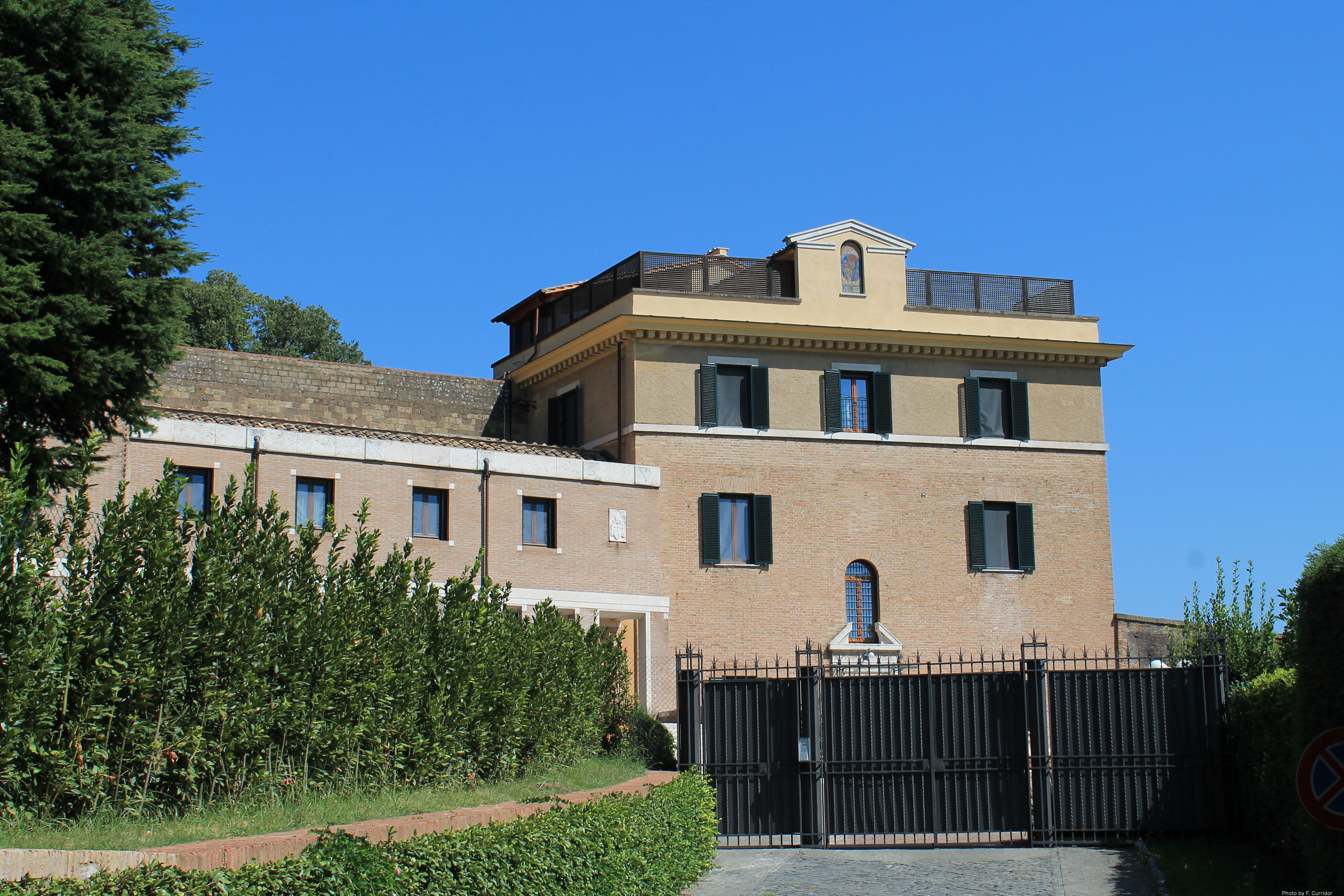

- Location on a map of Vatican City
- Interactive map of Mater Ecclesiae Monastery

Monastery information
- Order: Poor Clares et al.
- Established: c. 1990
- Dedication: Mary, Mother of the Church
- Diocese: Rome

People
- Founder: Pope John Paul II
- Important associated figures: Pope Emeritus Benedict XVI

Architecture
- Functional status: private residence
- Groundbreaking: 1992
- Completion date: 1994; renovated 2012-2013

Site
- Coordinates: 41°54′14″N 12°27′04″E

The Mater Ecclesiae Monastery (Latin for "Mother of the Church" dedicated to Mary) is a monastery in Vatican City. It was founded around 1990 by Pope John Paul II as a monastery for cloistered nuns who pray specifically for the health of the pope. Various cloistered orders are invited to take up residence for a time. It served as the residence of Pope Benedict XVI from his resignation in 2013 until his death in 2022. In 2023, Pope Francis returned it to its monastic purpose with an invitation to Benedictine nuns of the Abbey of St. Scholastica in Victoria, Argentina.

== History ==
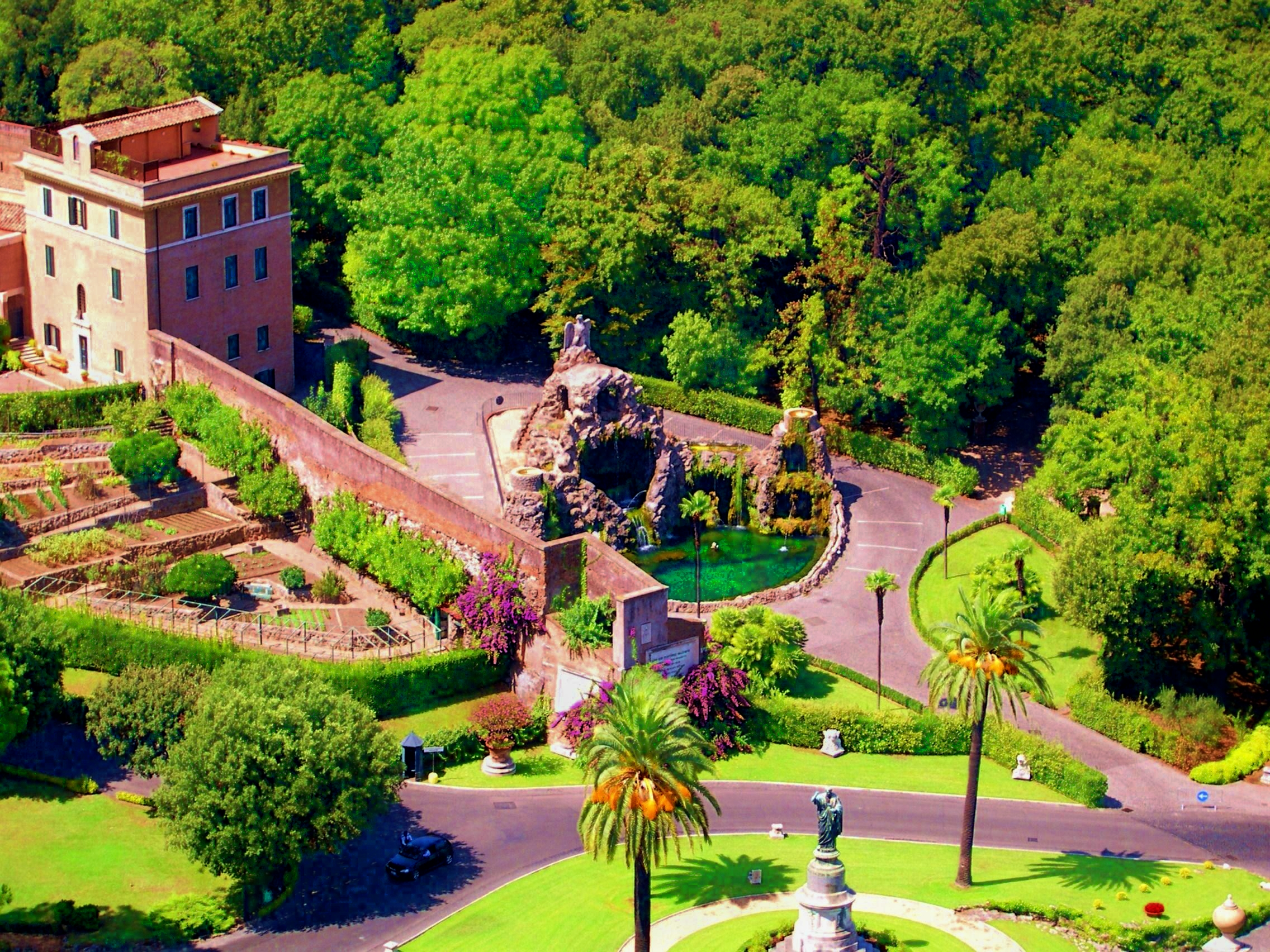
The gardens next to the monastery

The monastery, named after a Catholic title for Mary as "Mother of the Church" (Latin: Mater Ecclesiae), is located on the Vatican Hill inside the Vatican Gardens and near the Aquilone fountain. It was founded by Pope John Paul II in order to have a community of nuns of an enclosed religious order inside Vatican City, who were to pray for the pope in his service to the Catholic Church. This task was first entrusted to the Poor Clares with the understanding that a different order of nuns would be invited to occupy the Monastery every five years.

The building was erected between 1992 and 1994 in place of an administrative building of the Vatican police. Its structure is incorporated into the Leonine walls. The building is divided in two parts: The western chapel (two floors and rectangular in shape) and the eastern community rooms and monastic cells (rectangular in shape and, on the Aquilone fountain's side, with four floors, with 12 monastic cells on the second and third floors, and a refectory, store, kitchen, infirmary, archives and an office-studio on the ground and lower ground floors). Adjacent to the monastery is a fruit and vegetable garden. Pope Benedict XVI visited the monastery several times and celebrated Mass for the nuns.

After his retirement in February 2013, Benedict moved into the monastery on 2 May 2013. He lived there accompanied by a few assistants, with their domestic needs cared for by a small community of women belonging to a secular institute called Memores Domini, part of the Communion and Liberation movement. He died there on 31 December 2022.

== Resident religious orders ==
The nuns who have occupied the monastery are:

- Order of Saint Clare (1994–1999)
- Order of the Discalced Carmelites (1999–2004)
- Order of Saint Benedict (2004–2009)
- Order of the Visitation of Holy Mary (2009–2012)
- Interruption (2012–2013)
- Residential home of Pope Emeritus Benedict XVI (2013–2022)
- Order of Saint Benedict, of the Abbey of Saint Scholastica of Victoria, Diocese of San Isidro (2024–)

== See also ==
- Index of Vatican City-related articles
