= Peter Seewald =

German journalist and writer

Peter Seewald (born July 10, 1954, in Bochum) is a German journalist and author with a focus on religious topics, especially on Pope Benedict XVI.

== Life ==
Peter Seewald grew up in Salzweg near Passau in Lower Bavaria in a Catholic family. His originally close religious ties - as a boy he was chief altar server in his home parish - gave way early on to an attitude critical of the church in the course of the 1968 Movement, during which he became a supporter of Marxism and which led to his leaving the church in 1973. In the summer of 1976 he founded the left-liberal weekly newspaper Passauer Kleine Zeitung in Passau, which was discontinued two years later, in spring 1978.

Seewald was an editor at Der Spiegel from 1981 to 1987 and a reporter at Stern from 1987 to 1990. He then moved to the magazine of the Süddeutsche Zeitung, which he left in 1993. Since then he has been a freelance journalist. After leaving the Catholic church, he continued to devote himself to religious topics. From a detailed interview with Cardinal Joseph Ratzinger in 1996, his book Salz der Erde (Salt of the Earth) emerged, which he published together with Ratzinger and which portrays the future pope apart from the roles that are often described to him. According to Seewald, this interview was also the reason for a religious reconsideration, which finally resulted in his re-entry into the Catholic Church.

From this point on, he devoted himself to religious topics. Among his subsequent works is Gott und die Welt (God and the World), another book he published together with Ratzinger. Both joint publications became bestsellers that were translated in many languages. Seewald had a good, close relationship with Ratzinger, whom he describes as partly responsible for his conversion. After Ratzinger's election as Pope he wrote two portraits about him.

In the summer of 2010, Seewald stayed in Castel Gandolfo for a few days to join Pope Benedict XVI to prepare a third interview book. Seewald's interview with Pope Benedict XVI. was published at the end of November 2010 under the title Licht der Welt (Light of the World). The pope's statements contained therein were interpreted in the media as a relativization of the refusal to use condoms.

== Selected works ==
- 1996: Joseph Ratzinger: Salz der Erde: Christentum und katholische Kirche im 21. Jahrhundert – Ein Gespräch mit Peter Seewald. DVA, ISBN 3421050465.
- 2000: Gott und die Welt – Glauben und Leben in unserer Zeit. DVA, ISBN 3421054282.
- 2002: Die Schule der Mönche. Herder, Freiburg, ISBN 3451274612.
- 2004: Als ich begann, wieder an Gott zu denken. Heyne, ISBN 3453878795.
- 2005: Der deutsche Papst – Von Joseph Ratzinger zu Benedikt XVI. Verlagsgruppe Weltbild und Axel Springer AG, ISBN 3-89897-252-6.
- 2005: Benedikt XVI. Ein Porträt aus der Nähe. Ullstein Verlag, ISBN 3550078331.
- 2005: Gloria: Die Fürstin – Im Gespräch mit Peter Seewald. ISBN 9783453380004.
- 2006: Benedikt XVI. Leben und Auftrag. Verlagsgruppe Weltbild, ISBN 389897474X.
- 2009: Jesus Christus – die Biografie, Pattloch Verlag, ISBN 978-3-629-02192-2.
- 2010: Licht der Welt, Ein Gespräch mit Papst Benedikt XVI., Herder Verlag, Freiburg, ISBN 978-3-451-32537-3.
- 2016: Gott ohne Volk – Die Kirche und die Krise des Glaubens mit Stefan Oster, Droemer, ISBN 978-3-426-30103-6.
- 2016: Benedikt XVI. Letzte Gespräche. Droemer, ISBN 978-3-426-27695-2.
- 2019: Die Schule der Mönche. Bene! Verlag, ISBN 978-3-963-40070-4 (256 S.)
- 2020: Benedikt XVI. – Ein Leben. Droemer Verlag, München, ISBN 978-3-426-27692-1.
