= 1989 Vatican AIDS conference =

The 1989 Vatican AIDS conference, known officially as the Fourth International Conference of the Pontifical Council for Pastoral Assistance to Health Care Workers, was a three-day academic symposium that ran from November 13 to November 15, 1989. Hosted by the Pontifical Council for the Pastoral Care of Health Care Workers at the Synod Hall in Vatican City, it included over 1,000 delegates, including church leaders and the world's top scientists and AIDS researchers, from 85 countries. The theme was "To live: why? AIDS : Church and health in the world." Attendees gathered to develop a pandemic response that was total, spiritual, cultural, psychological, and medical.

== Prior meeting of American bishops ==
At the semi-annual meeting of the bishops of the United States just prior to the Vatican conference, the American bishops overwhelmingly adopted, by a 219–4 vote, a 68-page statement entitled "Called to Compassion and Responsibility: A Response to the HIV/AIDS Crisis." (Note: The statement was prepared by Cardinals Roger Mahony, Joseph Bernardin, Bernard F. Law, and Bishops William H. Keeler and Raymond W. Lessard.)

The statement made several points, including calling for the best medical and scientific information, the need for HIV-infected people to be treated with care and compassion, and the need for greater education to inform the public about the disease. The bishops also called for additional resources, both medical and pastoral, for people with AIDS, and for their civil rights to be protected. Governments and private groups were called upon to devote more resources to find a cure and to prevent the transition of the virus.

Dioceses were also encouraged to train clergy and laity to minister to AIDS victims and their families. It urged Catholics to pray daily for those with HIV and AIDS. Called to Compassion also rejected mandatory universal testing for AIDS.

The statement also reiterated traditional Catholic sexual morality and rejected condoms and needle exchange programs as methods to halt the spread, though the section on condoms made up only a small portion of the document. The bishops' position on condoms was criticized by some as "unrealistic," "irresponsible," and would cause additional deaths. Experts believe that to avoid contracting HIV the best method is to avoid sex, but that condoms should be used if having sex.

The statement said that treating AIDS patients with reverence, love, and compassion was "the only authentic Gospel response" and condemned discrimination or violence against people with AIDS. It rejected the notion that AIDS was to be seen as a punishment from God, and efforts to soften that language were unsuccessful for fear that it could be used as a pretense to harm LBGT people or might be seen as portraying HIV as "God's revenge."

== Conference ==
The goal of the conference was to find a team approach to dealing with the pandemic that looked at the issue holistically. It was a formal affair, with little open dissent or opportunity for discussion. Informal discussions took place outside of formal sessions. One attendee said this was due to having 50 speakers in three days, rather than a deliberate attempt to prevent dialogue or debate.

Another attendee, an American Jesuit priest, said the lack of dialogue and interaction made it the worst conference he had ever attended. Cardinal John O'Connor of New York said he would have organized the conference differently, including the voices of people with AIDS, adding increased discussion, and including hands-on activities.

=== First day ===
The opening speech of the conference was given by O'Connor. In it, he predicted that New York City alone would be spending $4.5 million a day to care for AIDS patients by 1991. Robert Gallo, the co-discoverer of HIV, predicted that a viable AIDS vaccine would be available by 1991 or 1992.

=== Second day ===
The second day of the conference focused on scientific and medical questions relating to AIDS, and less on the behaviors that could bring it. Edmund Pellegrino, a bioethicist from Georgetown University, said doctors had a moral obligation to provide care to AIDS patients without discrimination. Any doctor who refused, he said, should have his license revoked. He also said they should tell patients that their spouses were infected with AIDS, even if the infected spouse did not consent to the disclosure.

=== Third day ===
The final day opened with a speech by theologian Rocco Buttiglione. In "AIDS: the Wrath of God?", Buttiglione asserted that AIDS was a divine punishment "sent by God to call people back to truth and justice." He also urged compassion for those with the virus. Angelini, on the other hand, said AIDS was not a punishment from God but instead reflected a breakdown in societal values.

At the closing of the conference, John Paul II called for a global plan to combat AIDS and pledged the full support of the Catholic Church for those who were battling it. They were his most expansive comments on the disease to that point. The Church, he said, was "called upon as a protagonist in this new area of human suffering." Doing so, he said, was fundamental to the mission of the Church. He said the Church was called to both help prevent the spread of the disease and to care for those infected with it.

The pope also deplored what he viewed as the destructive behaviors that spread the disease, including "abuse of sexuality," a reference to gay sex. He also implicitly opposed the use of condoms to prevent the spread of HIV. He added that "AIDS has by far many more profound repercussions of a moral, social, economic, juridical and structural nature, not only on individual families and in neighbourhood communities, but also on nations and on the entire community of peoples."

His speech was interpreted by an American priest in attendance as the pope pledging his solidarity and that of the Church with people with AIDS.

=== Post-conference events ===
Following the conference, James M. Graham, an American priest, was appointed as the president of the newly formed International Christian AIDS Network. The network was charged with providing information to priests around the world on HIV and AIDS.

=== Protests ===
The first day of the conference was briefly halted when John White, an Irish priest, was detained outside. White, who contracted HIV while serving as a missionary in Kenya, held a sign stating "The Church Has AIDS." (Note: Some sources report the sign said "The Vatican has AIDS.") White held the sign in protest of a lack of speaking roles for AIDS victims and was unhappy with the moralizing tone many of the speakers took. He was later readmitted to the conference by Angelini. White announced to the conference that he had AIDS and received loud applause when he and Angelini embraced.

AIDS activist Bob Kunst handed out fliers outside the conference hall that said the conference was a sham.

==== People with AIDS ====
People with AIDS were invited to attend the conference, but none were asked to speak. As White was being escorted from the hall, he told reporters that as an AIDS victim he had no voice at the conference. Upset that they did not have a direct voice during the official proceedings, roughly 50 victims, priests, nuns, and healthcare professionals held sessions in a side room to formulate their own agenda. They felt the first day was too focused on sexual behavior and drug abuse.

One AIDS patient, Peter Larkin, asked to speak at the closing session but was denied. Larkin also decried the Church's prohibition on the use of condoms. He later spoke with Pope John Paul II.

== Issues ==
=== Condoms ===
Church officials were unanimous in their opposition to contraceptive measures to prevent the spread of HIV. The Church's position differed from that of most governments and private organizations.

Monsignor Carlo Caffarra, an advisor to John Paul II on sexual issues, told the conference that campaigns to promote condoms made the pandemic worse because condoms were "far from reliable" and encouraged high-risk behavior. He said condoms were not morally justified even if used by married couples to prevent an HIV-positive spouse from infecting their healthy partner. William Blattner, the head of viral epidemiology at the National Cancer Institute agreed with Caffarra, adding that distributing needles to drug addicts was also encouraging high-risk behavior.

O'Connor also reiterated his opposition to condoms as a method to prevent the transition of HIV. He said healthcare professionals who did not address the moral dimensions of sexual activity or drug use, or dissuade their patients from engaging in immoral acts, did a great disservice to those with AIDS. Some healthcare workers, he said, encouraged condoms to avoid naming gay sex and drug use as the problem. "Good morality," he said, "is good medicine." Gallo disagreed with O'Connor, saying he felt parts of O'Connor's speech were upsetting because, unlike O'Connor, not everyone believed in an afterlife.

Some attendees, including Gallo and Luc Montagnier of the Pasteur Institute, defended condoms as a tool to prevent transmission. August Wilhelm Von Eiff, a German doctor and medical ethicist, said he deplored "every aspect of condom propaganda." As a doctor, however, he counselled his married patients to use condoms to prevent transmission from an infected spouse to a non-infected spouse, and also to prevent the conception of a child infected with the virus. Other theologians said married couples in which one spouse had the virus should remain abstinent. Kunst, the director of an AIDS care center in Miami, said the Church's position was "seriously flawed and irrelevant."

=== Compassion for AIDS victims ===
At the opening session of the conference, O'Connor urged people with HIV/AIDS to be treated with respect and not as public health hazards, as outcasts, or shunned and left to die. This included, he said, those in prison who were often put in solitary confinement until they died. He worried that a "euthanasia mindset" would lead to many people with AIDS dying alone, covered with sores, and mad. He noted that the Church had historically embraced the sinner even while condemning the sin.

Archbishop Fiorenzo Angelini, the convention's convener, said "victims are our brothers and we should not sit in judgement of them."

== Homosexuality ==
Discussions were complicated by the Church's position on homosexuality and its relationship to AIDS. The Catholic Church teaches that being gay is not sinful, but that gay sex acts are. At the time of the convention, it was estimated that 72% of American AIDS victims contracted HIV through gay sex.

== Works cited ==
- Smith, Raymond A. (27 August 1998). Encyclopedia of AIDS: A Social, Political, Cultural, and Scientific Record of the HIV Epidemic. Routledge. ISBN 978-1-135-45754-9.
- Petro, Anthony Michael (2015). After the Wrath of God: AIDS, Sexuality, and American Religion. Oxford University Press. ISBN 978-0-19-939128-8.
- Gravend-Tirole, Xavier (30 November 2008). "Catholicism and the AIDS Pandemic". In Sharma, Arvind (ed.). The World's Religions after September 11. ABC-CLIO. ISBN 978-0-275-99622-2.
- Jung, Patricia Beattie (2008). Siker, Jeffrey S. (ed.). Homosexuality and Religion. Greenwood Publishing Group. ISBN 978-0313330889.
