= Marcel Callo =

French typographer

Blessed Marcel Callo

Martyr
- Born: 6 December 1921; Rennes, Ille-et-Vilaine, France
- Died: 19 March 1945 (aged 23); Mauthausen, Nazi Germany
- Venerated in: Roman Catholic Church
- Beatified: 4 October 1987, Saint Peter's Square, Vatican City by Pope John Paul II
- Feast: 19 March, 19 April (Austria)

Marcel Callo (6 December 1921 – 19 March 1945) was a French Catholic member of the Young Christian Workers, a Catholic Action movement inspiring lay participation and solidarity with the poor.

Callo served as an apprentice at a print store from the age of thirteen before joining Catholic associations in France. He was conscripted to serve during World War II and the Gestapo arrested him in 1944 for his Christian activities. He died in the Mauthausen concentration camp after being forced to do long hours of labour.

Because he died for his Catholic faith, Pope John Paul II beatified him on 4 October 1987.

== Life ==
Marcel Callo was born in Rennes on 6 December 1921 as the second of nine children to Marcel Callo and Felicita Maria Giuseppina; one brother was Giovanni (who became a priest) and a sister was Maria Maddalena.

Callo was known as a child for being a leader-like figure and for his perfectionist attitude. He was known for his good sense of humor as well as for his fondness of games such as ping pong and cards.

He attended a range of schools in Rennes and also served as an altar server until the age of seven. Callo became a Scout at the age of ten in 1931 and considered himself to be as such for the remainder of his life; he left them at the age of eleven. Callo gained work as an apprentice at the age of thirteen on 1 October 1934 in a printing store in Rennes. Callo did not like to associate himself with fellow workers who swore or who told improper stories and aligned himself with fellow Christians. He was in a work camp in Zella-Mehlis during the Nazi era. Here he began his Catholic work

He joined the Young Christian Workers – also known as the Jocists – in 1935 that Joseph Leo Cardijn (future cardinal) had established. His mother approached Callo on one particular occasion and asked her son if he had an inclination to become a priest like his brother but a candid Callo responded to her: "I do not feel called to the priesthood; I think I do more good by remaining in the world".

Following the Nazi invasion of France in 1940 during World War II he and his friends made trips to the same train station on a frequent basis in order to assist the refugees that were fleeing from Eastern Europe.

He became engaged to Marguerite Derniaux (d. 1997) at the age of 20 but due to the war the couple never married.

He was conscripted to serve during the war and his original intention was to flee but remembered that if he did so those he left back home would be arrested to coerce him. He was reluctant but agreed to serve and when conscripted said: "I'm leaving not as a worker but as a missionary in the service of my companions"; Callo departed on 19 March 1943 for his service and brought with him – which he kept at all times – his badges as both a Scout and a member of the Jocists. The Gestapo arrested Callo on 19 April 1944 due to his membership with the Jocists which was perceived to be an outlawed and secret order. The arresting officers told Callo that he was being taken because he was "too much of a Catholic" and was seen as a threat to the Nazi regime. He was sent to camps on 7 October 1944 in Gotha and then in Flossenbürg; from there he was taken to the Gusen I and II parts of the Mauthausen concentration camp in Austria (then part of Nazi Germany). It was there that Callo was placed through rigorous forced labor for a total of twelve hours where he was also abused and beaten.

In the dawn of 19 March 1945 he died after contracting tuberculosis and a mix of other ailments such as dysentery. He was buried in a mass grave outside the walls of the camp and his remains never recovered. Colonel Tibodo – who saw thousands die in the camps witnessed that of Callo's and said of it with emotion: "Marcel had the look of a saint"; Tibodo also testified for the beatification proceedings and said: "I have never seen in a dying man a look like his".

== Beatification ==
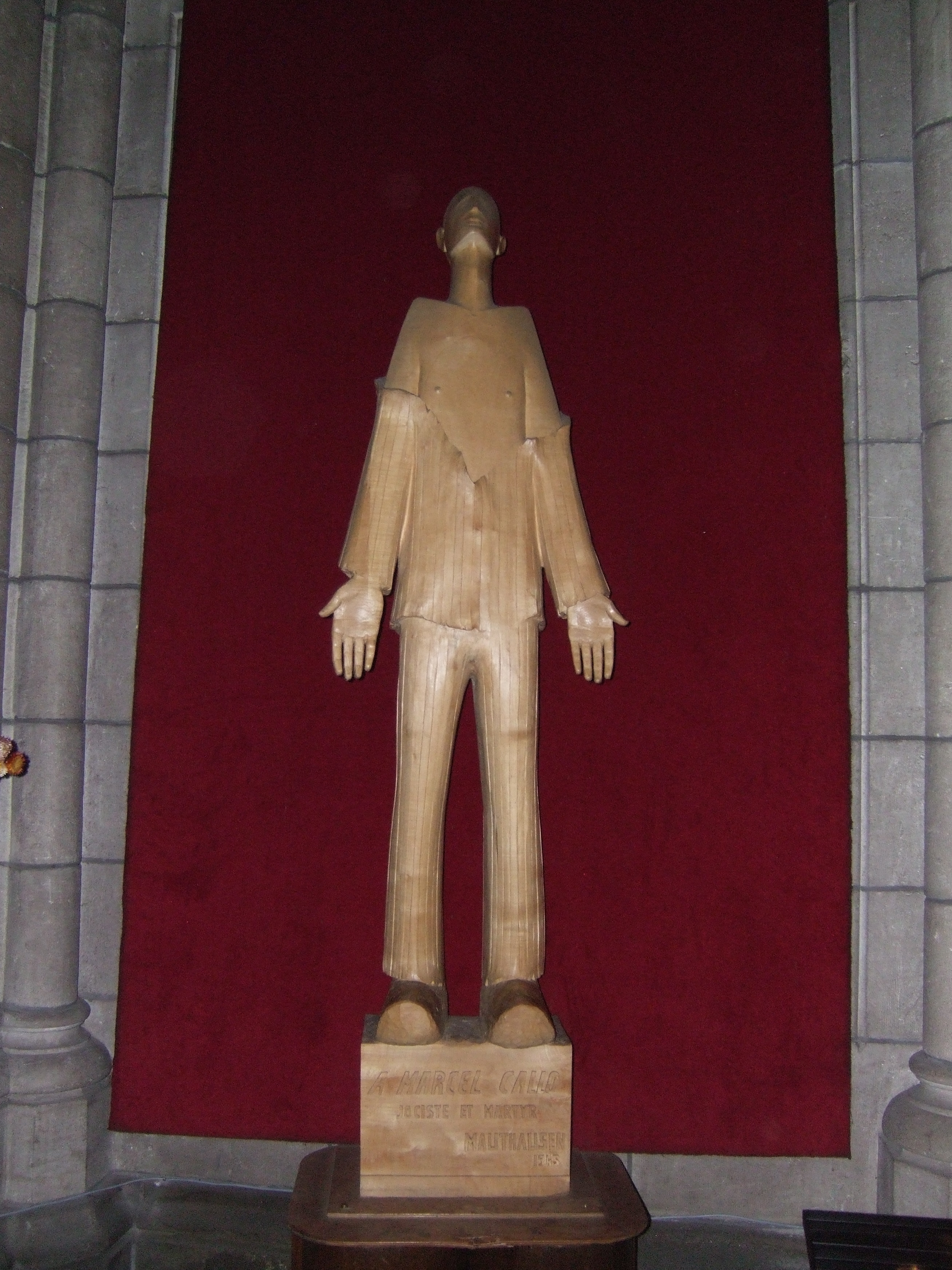
Statue in Rennes

The beatification process commenced in Rennes in a diocesan process from 1 March 1968 until 19 March 1969 in order to evaluate his life as well as the work he was involved with and the manner in which Callo died "in odium fidei" (in hatred of the faith). This took place despite the fact that the formal introduction of the cause came under Pope John Paul II on 7 January 1982 in an act that confirmed upon Callo the posthumous title Servant of God. A second process however was dispensed and allowed for the Congregation for the Causes of Saints to accept the process and decree it was valid on 9 January 1987 and commence the so-called "Roman Phase" in which Rome would begin its own line of investigation.

The Positio was submitted to Rome for investigation in 1987 and after both theologians and the Congregation approved the case it was taken to the pope who confirmed on 1 June 1987 that Callo had indeed died because of others’ hatred for his Catholic faith; this meant that he could be beatified without a required miracle. John Paul II beatified Callo on 4 October 1987.
