= James Martin Graham =

American Catholic priest and AIDS ministry leader

James Martin Graham (February 10, 1956 – July 3, 1997) American Roman Catholic priest, founder of The Sts. Martin & James Respite in Waterbury, Connecticut and Director of the International Christian AIDS Network (ICAN).

== Early years ==
Born in Lee, Massachusetts, Graham was the son of Nicholas F. Graham and Theresa Barenski Graham. As a child, he had a part-time job working for the painter Norman Rockwell, tidying up his studio. Graham's own grandmother was a cook for the artist and sat for a number of his paintings. He graduated from Lee High School in 1974 and received an associate degree in electrical technology from Hudson Valley Community College in Troy, NY, becoming a licensed electrician and starting his own business, James M. Graham Electrical Co., in Lee. In 1974, as a high school senior he won election to a seat on the Lee Town School Committee, becoming the youngest elected official in the Commonwealth of Massachusetts.

== Priesthood ==
Father Graham attended St. Thomas Seminary in Bloomfield, Connecticut, and later received his bachelor's degree in 1982 and master's degree in 1985, both in theology, from St. Mary's Seminary in Baltimore, Maryland. He was ordained a priest on 11 May 1985 at St. Michael's Cathedral in Springfield, Massachusetts, by the Most Rev. Joseph Francis Maguire, then Bishop of Springfield. He served as assistant pastor at Our Lady of Sacred Heart in Springfield, and at St. Patrick's Church in Hadley, Massachusetts. During his time as a parish priest with the Diocese of Springfield, Father Graham also served as Chaplain to the Massachusetts State Police.

=== AIDS Ministry ===
In 1989, he won support of then Archbishop of Hartford, John Francis Whealon, to establish the Archdiocese's Office of AIDS Ministry (OAM), headquartered in Waterbury, Connecticut, the first in the nation set up with a Roman Catholic priest as its full-time director. He started with a $4,000 grant from the Archdiocese and raised funds through private donations, grants and bequests as the operation expanded. The goal was to provide housing and medical care for terminally ill persons with AIDS, as well as assisted living facilities for HIV-infected individuals who otherwise might live on the streets or be shuttled between hospitals as their disease progressed. It was at this time, when the ministry was just beginning, that CBS Sunday Morning did a feature story about Father Graham and his work. Father Graham canvassed Connecticut hospitals administering the sacraments to AIDS patients and offering bereavement counseling to family members. He visited parishes throughout the archdiocese to raise AIDS awareness and to teach tolerance, compassion and caring towards people with HIV-disease and AIDS. In at least two instances, Father Graham assumed legal guardianship over individuals who were too ill and without kin, to make decisions on their behalf for their care. The tagline of Father Graham's ministry was "Celebrate the Living Years". At the time, hope for living normal lives with HIV-disease was almost unheard of. AZT treatment was still in its infancy and the disease was still a virtual death sentence. "Celebrate the Living Years" became Father Graham's rallying cry of encouragement to people living with HIV-disease and AIDS. Through his ministry, Father Graham was able to recruit countless volunteers to help realize the goal of creating and operating the hospice that grew out of the OAM and became The Sts. Martin & James Respite. Father Graham received papal recognition for his work.

=== Sts. Martin & James Respite ===
Between the summer of 1989 and the Spring of 1991, the Respite took occupancy of a compound of former mansions of old Waterbury's Chase family, known as Rose Hill, and other proximate buildings that had previously been medical offices, on Prospect and Grove Streets in Waterbury, Connecticut. The space allowed the plan for the Respite to evolve into a model multi-stage facility, including independent-living apartments, a 24-hour staffed hospice, a clinic for testing and walk-in medical care, a communal dining hall and professional kitchen, offices and staff quarters, all of which assured dignity in death with a church funeral and burial in a cemetery of the Archdiocese of Hartford. In November 1989, Father Graham traveled to the Vatican to attend the first-ever international conference on AIDS, "To Live: Why?", hosted by the Pontifical Council for Pastoral Assistance to Health Care Workers under the direction of then Archbishop Fiorenzo Angelini. At the conference, Father Graham gained notoriety for speaking up for a British former-priest who had not been allowed to speak because he had AIDS himself. Out of Father Graham's efforts to have the man heard, he was appointed by Archbishop Angelini as the director of the International Christian AIDS Network (ICAN), which ideally was envisioned to be a funnel through which efforts in AIDS research, care, and other news would be shared with concerned medical, hospitaler, nursing, scientific, and religious parties throughout the world. An ICAN Newsletter was published in four languages and distributed around the globe twice in 1990-91. The initial long-term goal for ICAN was to establish and build Respites in hard-afflicted areas of Africa. The Sts. Martin & James Chapel was fashioned out of the basement of one of the old mansions which over the years had degraded to becoming a shooting gallery for area heroin addicts. Father Graham and a team of volunteers transformed the space into a chapel with a slate floor and exposed brick walls. The pastor of an area church donated an unused pulpit and tabernacle, Father Graham found a solid hickory pedestal and marble top for the altar at an architectural refuse company—all were incorporated into the design. The kneeling angel sculpture which stood sentinel at the tabernacle holding aloft the sanctuary lamp, would much later be reassigned as the monument on Father Graham's own grave. The Sts. Martin & James Chapel, named for Saint Martin de Porres and Saint James the Greater (James, son of Zebedee), was consecrated by Archbishop Whealon on 3 January 1990. Every Sunday from then on, Mass would be celebrated in the Chapel in memory of all persons who had died of AIDS around the world. In June 1990, Archbishop Angelini paid a visit to the Respite from Rome during which the main hospice residence was christened and named "The Archbishop +Fiorenzo Angelini Residence" after him. Local television covered the event and the Archbishop was quoted as saying that the Respite had become "a model to follow for offering shelter and physical and spiritual care—for all". The Archbishop presented Father Graham with a Sterling silver stalk of wheat, handcrafted in Rome, which was later affixed to the door of the chapel's tabernacle. In November 1990, Father Graham returned to Rome for the Pontifical Council's conference on The Human Mind, where Archbishop Angelini presented Father Graham to Pope John Paul II who commended him for his work. Unfortunately, after investing much money to renovate the buildings, a financial dispute with the real estate firm that owned the Rose Hill properties forced the Respite to find other accommodations. Eventually, the annual budget for the operation of the Respite compound and professional care for its residents exceeded $500,000, all of which Graham had to raise through donations, grants, bequests, etc. A Waterbury industrialist offered the historic Elton Hotel on the Green, which was listed for sale through his agency. A lease agreement was reached to retain the Angelini Residence from the Rose Hill property, but all else was moved to the Elton Hotel by March 1991. An architect volunteered to assist in transforming the building into a complex of 24-hour care, assisted living, and secure facilities for incarcerated persons with advanced HIV or AIDS who would be sent from the area's prisons, as well as a chapel and offices and apartments for the permanent staff. Weekly Masses would henceforth be held at Our Lady of Lourdes Church nearby on South Main Street. But, as the organization was financially struggling to stay afloat, by the end of 1991 Father Graham abandoned the hotel in favor of operating only the Angelini Residence. While all of this was happening, through it all, Father Graham had secretly been battling his own medical nightmares, advanced HIV-disease and MS (multiple sclerosis). The Angelini Residence remained open until October 1992, when Graham finally decided to close its doors. His lack of energy because of his own affliction, lack of money and the state takeover of many of the Respite's tasks led him to focus in another direction.

== Last years and death ==
Father Graham retired to Baltimore and in his last years lobbied in Washington, with corporations and the U.S. Congress, to increase Medicaid assistance to needy AIDS patients and assist in the development of nursing homes throughout the Northeast, in Massachusetts and Connecticut. Through the Corporal Works Foundation, which Graham helped to establish, he continued his fund-raising efforts to help AIDS-related organizations. He became the chaplain at the Human Virology Research Institute at the University of Maryland, which was headed by Dr. Robert Gallo, a Waterbury, Connecticut native and internationally renowned AIDS researcher. Father Graham died in Baltimore on 3 July 1997 at the age of 41, ultimately of advanced MS deterioration and HIV complications, but after suffering from an infection related to the injection port he had been incorrectly fitted with. His funeral was held on 9 July at St. Peter's Church in Great Barrington, Massachusetts and he was buried at nearby St. Peter's Cemetery, with the kneeling angel that once guarded the tabernacle in the Sts. Martin and James Respite Chapel.
