= Javier Lozano Barragán =

Mexican cardinal (1933–2022)

His Eminence Javier Lozano Barragán
- President Emeritus of the Pontifical Council for Pastoral Assistance to Health Care Workers
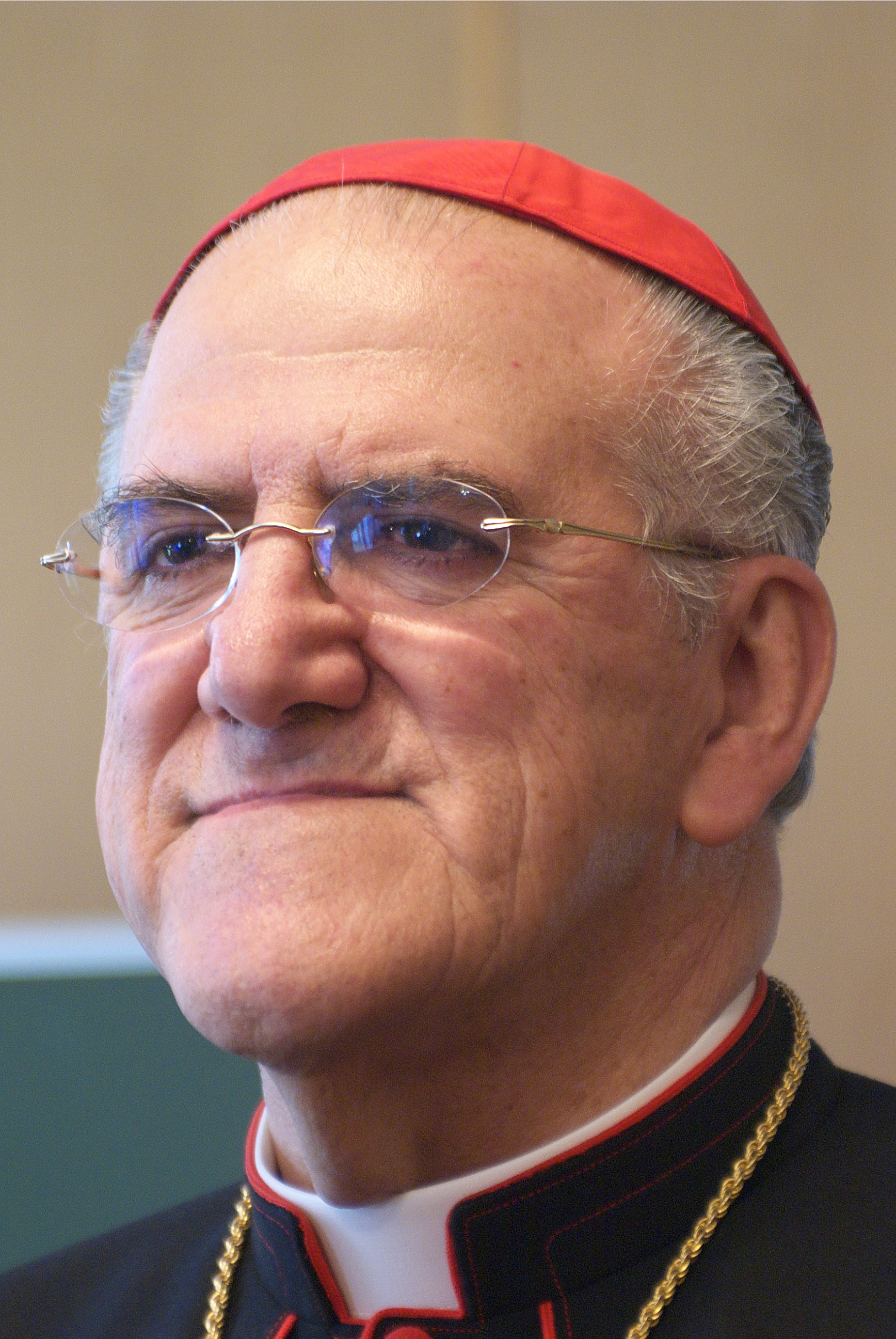
- Lozano Barragán in 2006
- Appointed: 7 January 1997
- Term ended: 18 April 2009
- Predecessor: Fiorenzo Angelini
- Successor: Zygmunt Zimowski
- Other post: Cardinal Priest of S. Dorotea
- Previous posts: Titular Bishop of Thinisa in Numidia (1979–1984); Auxiliary Bishop of México (1979–1984); Bishop of Zacatecas (1984–1997); Cardinal-deacon of San Michele Arcangelo a Pietralata (2003–2014)

Orders
- Ordination: 30 October 1955 by Carlo Confalonieri
- Consecration: 15 August 1979 by Ernesto Corripio y Ahumada
- Created cardinal: 21 October 2003 by Pope John Paul II
- Rank: Cardinal Priest

Personal details
- Born: 26 January 1933 Toluca, Mexico
- Died: 20 April 2022 (aged 89) Rome, Italy
- Denomination: Roman Catholic
- Coat of arms

Styles of Javier Lozano Barragán
- Reference style: His Eminence
- Spoken style: Your Eminence
- Religious style: Monsignor
- Informal style: Cardinal
- See: Zacatecas

Javier Lozano Barragán (Spanish pronunciation: [xaˈβjeɾ loˈsano βaraˈɣan]; 26 January 1933 – 20 April 2022) was a Mexican prelate of the Catholic Church who was president of the Pontifical Council for the Pastoral Care of Health Care Workers from 1997 to 2009. He was made a cardinal in 2003. He was auxiliary bishop of the Archdiocese of Mexico from 1979 to 1984 and bishop of Zacatecas from 1984 to 1997.

== Early life and education ==
Born in Toluca, State of México, on 26 January 1933, Lozano Barragán trained at the seminary in Zamora, Michoacán, and was ordained a priest on 30 October 1955 while studying in Rome, where he earned a doctorate in dogmatic theology at the Pontifical Gregorian University in 1958. Returning to Mexico, he taught at the seminary in Zamora In the 1970s he served as president first of the Mexican Theological Society and then of the Theological Pastoral Institute of the Latin American Episcopal Council (CELAM).

== Bishop ==
On 5 June 1979, Lozano Barragán was appointed auxiliary bishop of the Archdiocese of Mexico. He received his episcopal consecration on 15 August from Cardinal Ernesto Corripio y Ahumada, Archbishop of Mexico. While in that position, he helped to found the Pontifical University of Mexico and served on its leadership council from 1982-1985.

On 28 October 1984 he was named bishop of Zacatecas. While in that post he was made a member of two Curial bodies, the Pontifical Council for Dialogue with Non-Believers and the Congregation for the Evangelization of Peoples.

== Curial service ==
On 31 October 1996 he was appointed president of the Pontifical Council for the Pastoral Care of Health Care Workers and given the personal title of archbishop.

Lozano Barragán was made Cardinal-Deacon of San Michele Arcangelo a Pietralata by Pope John Paul II on 21 October 2003.

Upon the death of Pope John Paul, he was one of many crediting him with miracles, citing the case of a four-year-old Mexican boy who recovered from leukemia without explanation after the pope hugged and kissed him on a visit to Zacatecas in 1990.

Lozano Barragán was one of the cardinal electors who participated in the 2005 papal conclave that selected Pope Benedict XVI.

In 2006 Pope Benedict asked Lozano Barragán to prepare a report on condoms and AIDS to allow Curia officials to study "both the scientific and technical aspects linked to the condom, as well as the moral implications in all their amplitude". He downplayed reports that it was anything more than a study and said "we are in the first stage" and that it was scientific in nature and would not extend to assessing morality.

On two occasions he opposed the withdrawal of life-sustaining treatments, including artificial nutrition and hydration (ANH), from patients had spent years in a vegetative state. In 2005, when Terry Schiavo died after the withdrawal of life support after 15 years, he said: "Let’s stop with the euphemisms—they killed her." In 2009, he called the withdrawal of ANH from Eluana Englaro after 17 years "monstrous and inhuman murder".

On 18 April 2009, Pope Benedict accepted Lozano Barragán's resignation for reasons of age and appointed Zygmunt Zimowski to the post.

== In retirement ==
The following December, Lorenzo Barragán condemned the use of the RU-486 pill as "a crime that demands punishment". He described its authorization as "worse than liberalizing the sake of weapons". That same month, he discussed the Church's teaching on homosexuality and salvation. He said media reports attributing to him the view that homosexuals can not be saved had misconstrued his reference to Saint Paul's Letter to the Romans which condemns individual homosexuals. He said scripture can not be used to condemn all homosexuals. Rather, he said that "many times one is not a homosexual through one's own fault; it all depends on one's education and environment." He offered the view "that for grave fault to exist, in addition to needing grave matter, one needs full knowledge and full consent: Where one of those three conditions is lacking, there is no grave fault."

Having been ten years as a cardinal deacon, he was promoted to Cardinal-Priest of Santa Dorotea by Pope Francis on 12 June 2014.

Lozano Barragán died in Rome on 20 April 2022. In offering his condolences, Pope Francis noted they had been friends since 1980.

Catholic Church titles
Preceded by Mario Revollo Bravo	Titular Bishop of Thinisa in Numidia; 5 June 1979 – 28 October 1984	Succeeded by Mario Picchi
Preceded by Rafael Muñoz Núñez	Bishop of Zacatecas; 28 October 1984 – 7 January 1997	Succeeded by Fernando Mario Chávez Ruvalcaba
Preceded by Fiorenzo Angelini	President of Pontifical Council for the Pastoral Care of Health Care Workers; 7 January 1997 – 18 April 2009	Succeeded by Zygmunt Zimowski
Preceded by Joseph Cardijn	Cardinal-Deacon of San Michele Arcangelo a Pietralata; 12 October 2003 – 12 June 2014	Succeeded by Michael Czerny
Titular church established	Cardinal-Priest of Santa Dorotea; 12 June 2014 – 20 April 2022	Vacant
