= Catholic Action =

Roman Catholic movement

Catholic Action is a movement of lay people within the Catholic Church which advocates for increased Catholic influence on society. Catholic Action groups were especially active in the nineteenth century in historically Catholic countries under anti-clerical regimes, such as Spain, Italy, Bavaria, France, and Belgium.

Catholic Action is not a political party in and of itself; however, in many times and places, these movements have engaged in political activities. Since World War II, the concept has often been supplanted by Christian Democrat parties that were organised to combat Communist parties and promote Catholic social justice principles in places such as Italy and West Germany. The movement in Europe was generally conservative in character. In China, Catholic Action was less conservative. There, it responded to participants' desire to evangelize China for the first time, situate Catholicism in the Chinese context, and organize Catholics for protection from Warlord violence.

Catholic Action generally includes various subgroups for youth, women, workers, and so on. In the postwar period, the various national Catholic Action organizations for workers formed the World Movement of Christian Workers, which remains active today as a voice within the Church and in society for working class Catholics.

== History ==
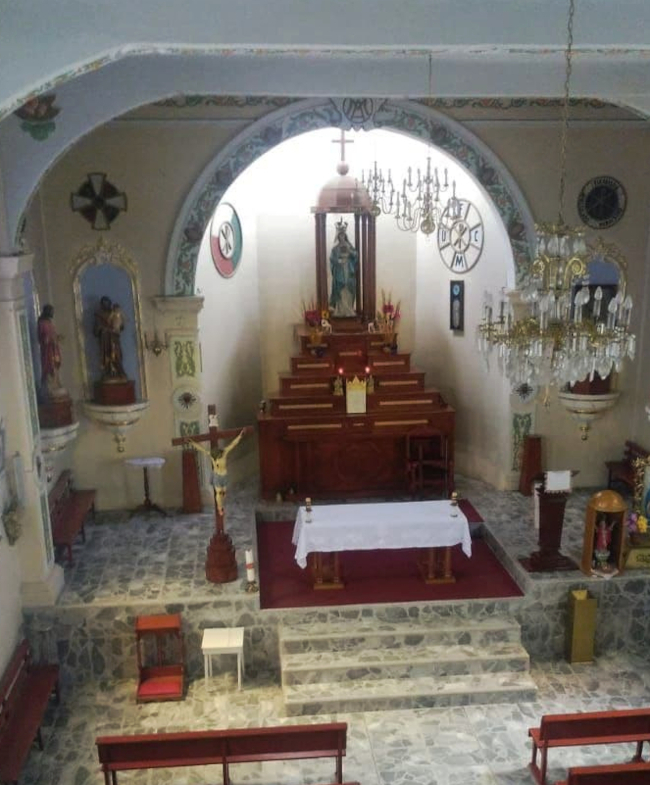
The emblems of Acción Católica Mexicana displayed on altar walls in the temple of Fábrica-María village, Otzolotepec, Mexico. In the 20th century, the movement was enthusiastically supported by the workers of the local textile industry.

The Catholic Action movement has its beginnings in the latter part of the 19th century as efforts to counteract a rise in anti-clerical sentiment, especially in Europe. The movement in Europe was conservative in character.

A variety of diverse groups formed under the concept of Catholic Action. These include the Young Christian Workers, the Young Christian Students; the Cursillo movement, RENEW International; the Legion of Mary; Sodalities; the Christian Family Movement; various community organizing groups like COPS (Communities Organized for Public Service) in San Antonio, and Friendship House in Harlem, an early influence on Thomas Merton.

Academic Stephanie M. Wong writes that in the interwar period, "Catholic Action promoted an especially 'masculine' form of Catholicism, rejecting the perceived 'feminization of Christianity' by the Social Gospel proponents."

Around 1912, as a curate in a parish in Laeken, on the outskirts of Brussels, Joseph Cardijn, who dedicated his ministry to aid the working class, founded for the young seamstresses a branch of the Needleworkers' Trade Union. In 1919 he founded the Young Trade Unionists. In 1924, the name of the organization was changed to "Jeunesse Ouvrière Chrétienne", the Young Christian Workers. JOC grew throughout the world; its members were often known as "Jocists" and the movement was often called "Jocism". By 1938, there were 500,000 members throughout Europe; in 1967, this had increased to 2,000,000 members in 69 countries.

In 1934, the Nazis murdered Erich Klausener, head of a Catholic Action group in Nazi Germany, during the Night of the Long Knives.

Pope Paul VI commended those who are "fighting for Christ in the ranks of Catholic Action and in the other associations and activities of the apostolate" in his first encyclical letter, Ecclesiam suam, linking their actions with the dialogue inside and outside the church which he saw as the work of the Second Vatican Council. (Note: The Council made reference to "Catholic Action" and similar apostolates with "some other title" in its Decree on the Apostolate of the Laity (Apostolicam Actuositatem) and its Decree concerning the Pastoral Office of Bishops in the Church (Christus Dominus), both published in 1965.)

A fruit of the contemporary Catholic Action movement, the International Catholic Union of the Press UCIP was founded in Belgium in 1927. A year later, the Organization Catholique Internationale du Cinéma (OCIC) was founded in The Netherlands, and the Bureau Catholic International de Radiodiffusion (BCIR), in Germany. It became Unda in 1946. Members of these professional Catholic lay associations, working in the world of the professional media, wanted to unite their efforts against the perceived secularization of society. On the one hand, they believed that the press and the new media of radio and cinema were contributing to secularization. On the other hand, they participated in the secular media in order to use them as a new means of evangelization. They answered a call from God through the church to evangelize the secular mass media, or at least endow them with Gospel values. As a result of the merger of the Catholic media organizations OCIC and Unda, a new organisation was founded in 2001 in Rome called SIGNIS. In 2014, the Holy See suggested that SIGNIS should also integrate the members of the former International Catholic Union of the Press (UCIP).

== By country ==
=== Australia ===
The National Civic Council is an Australian Catholic Action group formed in 1957 out of the Australian Catholic social studies movement under the leadership of B.A. Santamaria. Precursors to the NCC were active in the Australian Labor Party, but were expelled from the party by less conservative members during the 1955 Labor Split. The expelled members of the party went on to form the Australian Labor Party (Anti-Communist) and the subsequent Democratic Labor Party.

=== Chile ===
In Chile, Catholic Action was the name of a nationwide youth movement. Under the aegis of Saint Alberto Hurtado it was responsible for the founding of the Chilean Trade Union Association.

=== China ===
The Catholic Action movement in China had a different focus than the movement in Europe and was less conservative. Whereas Catholic Action in Europe sought to re-evangelize countries with a history of Catholicism in response to socialism or anti-clerical movements, participants in the Catholic Action movement in China viewed themselves as evangelizing China for the first time. In China, the basic "action" of the group was for lay Catholics to live out and share the Gospel. It also responded to a need for Catholics to organize themselves for protection from warlord violence.

Major figures in developing Catholic Action in China included Frédéric-Vincent Lebbe and Paul Yu Bin.

In 1912, Catholic Action societies throughout China were organized into the Union of the Association of Catholic Action in China.

In 1913, the Union of the Association of Catholic Action in China led a national lobbying efforts against attempts to make Confucianism the state religion of the Republic of China.

In 1928, Celso Benigno Luigi Costantini and the Shanghai Synod drafted proposed statutes for a nationwide Catholic Action society and sought approval from Rome. It was approved in 1933 and Paul Yu Bin appointed its clerical head. This iteration of Catholic Action included both social organizing and proposals to better situate Catholicism in the Chinese context, including efforts to replace the translation of Catholicism as Tianzhujiao (a term with legal significance under the unequal treaties and which therefore had associations with Western imperialism in China) with Gongjiao, which the society hoped would better convey Catholicism's universal aspects. (Note: As gong means "common" or "public".)

=== Italy ===
Azione Cattolica is probably the most active Catholic Action group still around today. Catholic Action was particularly well suited to Italy where Catholic party political action was impractical, firstly under the Anti-Clerical Savoyard regime from 1870 until about 1910 and later under the Fascist regime which prohibited independent political parties.

The present association Azione Cattolica was founded in 1867 by Mario Fani and Giovanni Acquaderni with the name of Società della Gioventù Cattolica Italiana (Italian Catholic Youth Society), then reformed during the Mussolini regime when the association was structured into 4 sectors and was called Azione Cattolica.

=== Lithuania ===
The Catholic Action Center (Lithuanian: Katalikų veikimo centras or KVC) was a Catholic Action organization active in interwar Lithuania from 1919 to 1940. It was an umbrella organization uniting and coordinating activities of various Roman Catholic societies and organizations in Lithuania.

=== Spain ===
The Catholic Action movement in Spain has a long history, playing an important role in the Franco regime through multiple different purposes. The group's role and freedoms would be protected by the 1953 Concordat signed by the Franco government the Vatican to regulate Church-State relations.

As a political group they threw their weight behind the Franco government and the Nationalists during the Spanish civil war in exchange for expanded rights for the church and itself in terms of freedom of action to apostolate. Within the government Catholic Action saw high profile figures appointed, in particular Martin Artajo as Foreign Minister and the one tasked with enhancing the Catholic Nature of the regime. Within the topic of Labour relations Catholic Action were able to form the only legal non-state worker's syndicate in the Hermandad Obrera de Acción Católica (HOAC). Despite legality and support of Catholic Action, the relationship between state/Falange and the HOAC would be tense as the group took a more confrontational approach to labour relations in the 1960s.

=== Elsewhere ===
Catholic Action was organised in many other countries, including:

- Argentina (still active)
- Brazil (see Alceu Amoroso Lima)
- Canada (see Catherine Doherty)
- Croatia (see Croatian Catholic movement)
- France (see La Croix)
- Guatemala (see Josefina Alonzo Martínez)
- Ireland (see Legion of Mary)
- Italy (see Azione Cattolica Italiana)
- Mexico (Acción Católica Mexicana)
- Poland (See Aleksander Cardinal Kakowski)
- Philippines (see Roman Catholic Archdiocese of Manila)
- Slovenia (see Katoliška akcija)
- United States (See Friendship House, Catholics for the Common Good and Catholic Worker Movement)

== See also ==
- Catholic social teaching
- Corporatism
- Political catholicism
- Student Catholic Action
- Pascual Abaj
- Manuel Aparici Navarro
- Bartolome Blanco Marquez, Youth leader of Catholic Action and martyr of the Spanish Civil War

== Sources ==
- IL FERMO PROPOSITO (On Catholic Action in Italy), Pius X, 1905
- Kertzer, David I. (2014). The Pope and Mussolini: The Secret History of Pius XI and the Rise of Fascism in Europe. Oxford University Press. ISBN 9780198716167.
