= Jeunesse Étudiante Chrétienne =

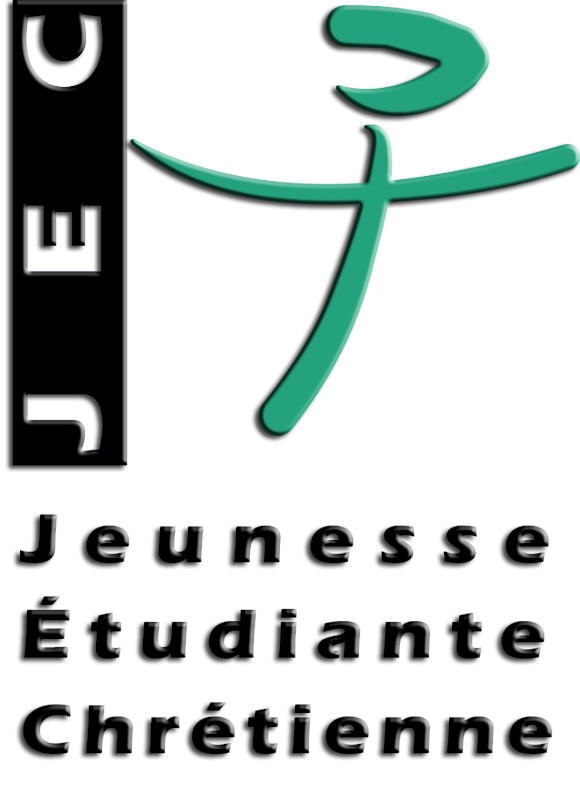

Jeunesse Étudiante Chrétienne (JEC) is a worldwide Catholic group of young students. The movement also goes by the English name YCS (Young Christian Students) and Juventud Estudiantil Catolica in Spanish.

== History ==
Created 1929 in France, as part of the Catholic social movement, the JEC was formed by students from the ACJF (Association Catholique de la Jeunesse Française) wishing to minister to other catholic students. The movement organised specialist branches. In 1935 the JEC, opposed fascism and Nazism and grew rapidly, in 1936, their first national convention had 4000 participants.

JEC movement grew in the spirit of the Specialized Catholic Action movements that were inspired by Joseph Cardijn (the founder of the Young Christian Workers) with the methodology of See-Judge-Act.

The JEC was a significant operator in the French resistance during World War II and continued to play a role in French political life until the 1960s. JEC members included numerous members of the resistance, politicians, media and university people, among them: Jacques Delors, Pascal Lamy, Joseph Fontanet, Gilbert Dru, Pierre Alviset, René Rémond, André de Péretti, Patrick Viveret, Pierre Rosanvallon, Geneviève Latreille, Antoine Spire, Jean-Pierre Sueur, Georges Montaron, Christophe Hondelatte, Claude-François Jullien, Roger-Henri Guerrand, Renaud Sainsaulieu, Jean-Marie Vincent, Jean-Yves Le Drian, and Jacques Bugnicourt.

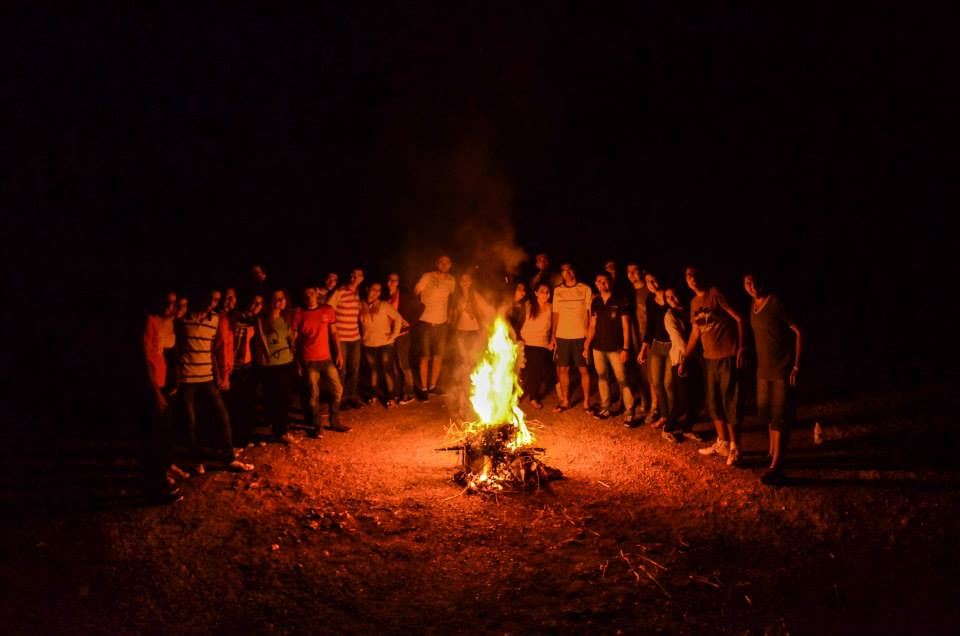
Jec Camping Fire, Property of Jec Syria

In the 1960s the JEC denounced torture and the French government's fighting against Algerian independence; this caused tensions with the bishops of the Roman Catholic Church in France. As a result, in 1965, the Church removed its mandate from the association. This engagement with the church lead to schism within the JEC, which lasted until the reconstruction in the 1980s.

== Today ==
Today the JEC continues its evangelistic mission amongst its members. Their objectives are to make students more aware of their social responsibilities and to help them maintain their faith. The JEC encourages its members to work for social change in their own environment.

The JEC has a General Consultative Status with the Economic and Social Commission (ECOSOC) of the United Nations, and an Operational Status with UNESCO in 1998.

JEC is recognized by the Holy See and since the World Council of Kampala in 2007, has the private juridical statute according to the Canon Law 298-311 and 321-329.

== Objectives ==
- A. Evangelize student milieu and promote students apostolate, by responding to their specific needs and stressing their responsibility.
- B. Bring together students seeking community; give them a space for formations and actions in the social vision of the Church at various levels.
- C. Promote a global solidarity among students and young people for joint reflections and actions leading for a more equitable social order.
- D. Give students more resources, pedagogic and methodology to integrate their Christian faith to their intellectual and social lives.
