= Paulian Association =

Roman Catholic organization

The Paulian Association is a Roman Catholic organisation founded in 1956 by Roy Boylan in Sydney, Australia. Roy was influenced by the Servant of God and Cardinal Joseph Cardijn, the founder of Young Christian Workers and his model of "see, judge, act". The Australian YCW has a contemporary profile on the ACNC and based at Granville NSW. as distinct from what is sometimes referred to as Catholic Action which also has a profile in Italy - see footnote about April 2024 letter of Pope Francis to Catholic Action Italy.

Paulian groups were set up in parishes throughout Australia. The activities of the association focused on youth, families, solo parents, aboriginal affairs, development, refugees and social justice.

In 1961, the Paulian Association established PALMS (now Palms Australia) which prepared and sent laity to work as volunteers in developing countries. The work was predominantly in education, trades and health, although now includes many other professions. Palms Australia became the largest of the Paulian programs and continues to send volunteers from Australia to the Pacific, Asia and Africa. Palms Australia has a contemporary registration as a charity with the Australian Charities and Not for profits Commission.

In 1963 the Paulian Association, in conjunction with the Christian Life Movement of South Australia began Project Compassion, a Lenten appeal, which has since become the major fundraising source of charity in Australia. Some reflections including photos from 50 years earlier can be seen in a brief news recap from the archives, published by the Archdiocese of Perth in 2021.
