= Santa Dorotea =

- Church of Saint Dorothy (in English); Sancti Dorotei (in Latin)
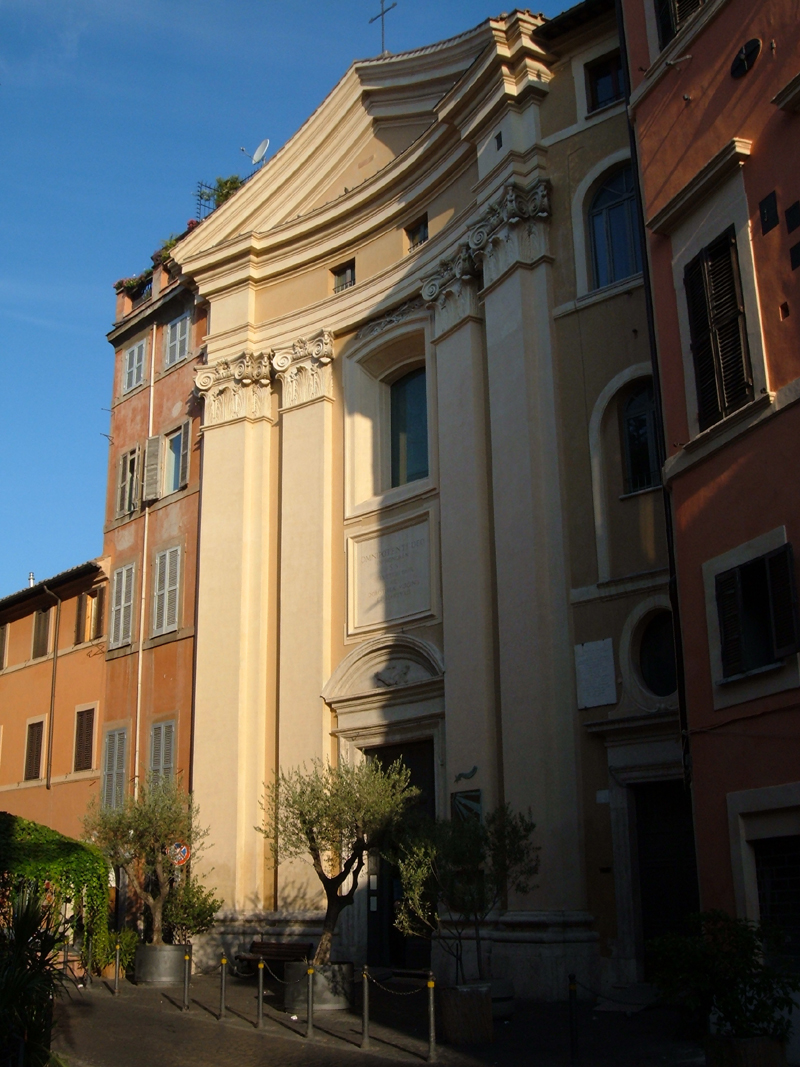
- Facade of Santa Doretea
- Click on the map for a fullscreen view
- 41°53′32″N 12°28′06″E
- Location: Via di Santa Dorotea 23, Rome
- Country: Italy
- Denomination: Catholic Church
- Tradition: Roman Rite
- Religious order: Conventual Franciscans
- Website: parrocchiasantadorotea.com

History
- Status: Titular church, Conventual church
- Dedication: Dorothea of Caesarea

Architecture
- Architectural type: Church
- Style: Baroque
- Groundbreaking: 1123

Administration
- District: Lazio
- Province: Diocese of Rome

Santa Dorotea is an ancient Catholic church in the Diocese of Rome served by the Conventual Franciscan friars. It was first attested to in a papal bull of Pope Callistus II in 1123, being referred to under its first dedication of San Silvestro alla Porta Settimiana.

== History ==
In 1445, it was recorded under the double dedication of SS Silvestro e Dorotea, the latter, Dorothea of Caesarea, being an obscure martyr of Caesarea in Cappadocia (modern Kayseri, Turkey) who might have been killed in the early 4th century if she existed at all. In 1475 the church was rebuilt and given full parochial status, and the relics of St Dorothy were enshrined here by Giuliano De Datis, the parish priest, in 1500.

In 1517, St Cajetan founded the Oratory of Divine Love in the sacristy. This is considered to have been a major event in the beginnings of the Catholic Counter-Reformation. In 1566, the church was re-listed under the present dedication and the first free public school in Europe was opened in 1592 by St Joseph Calasanz in the house next door, the first school of the Piarist Order of priest educators.

In 1727, the parish was suppressed, and in 1738 the church was granted to the Friars Minor Conventual. They demolished it again, and rebuilt it as the chapel of their new convent on the site. The rebuilding was entrusted to Giovanni Battista Nolli by Giovanni Carlo Vipera, Minister-General of the Conventuals. The parish was re-erected in 1824, and the church restored and re-consecrated in 1879.

On 12 June 2014, it was established as a titular church by Pope Francis with Javier Cardinal Lozano Barragán, president emeritus of the Pontifical Council for Pastoral Assistance to Health Care Workers, as its first Cardinal-Priest having served 10 years as a cardinal-deacon.

== List of Cardinal-Priests ==
- Javier Cardinal Lozano Barragán (12 June 2014 – 20 April 2022)
- Jorge Enrique Jiménez Carvajal (27 August 2022 – present)
