= Diocese of Zacatecas =

Roman Catholic diocese in Mexico

Diocese of Zacatecas Dioecesis Zacatecensis Diócesis de Zacatecas
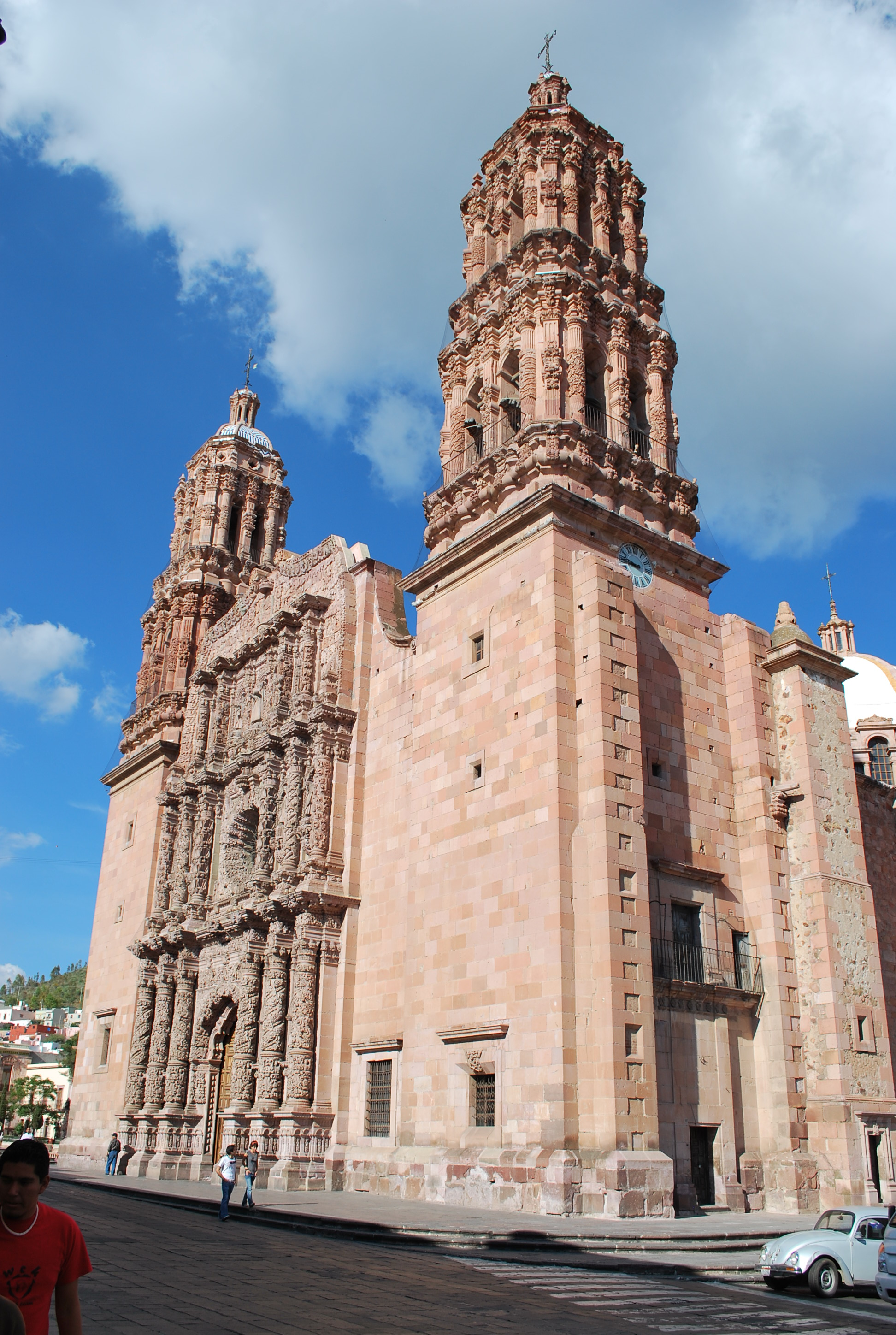
- Catedral Basílica de Nuestra Señora de la Asunción

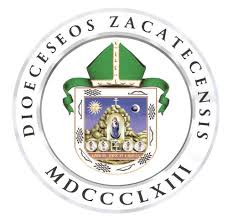
- Coat of arms

Location
- Country: Mexico
- Ecclesiastical province: Province of San Luis Potosí
- Metropolitan: Zacatecas, Zacatecas

Statistics
- Area: 22,788 sq mi (59,020 km^{2})
- Population: Total; Catholics: (as of 2008); 1,380,000; 1,124,000 (81.4%)
- Parishes: 108

Information
- Denomination: Roman Catholic
- Rite: Roman Rite
- Established: 26 January 1863 (162 years ago)
- Cathedral: Cathedral Basilica of Our Lady of the Assumption

Current leadership
- Pope: Leo XIV
- Bishop: Sigifredo Noriega Barceló
- Metropolitan Archbishop: Francisco Robles Ortega
- Bishops emeritus: Carlos Cabrero Romero

Map
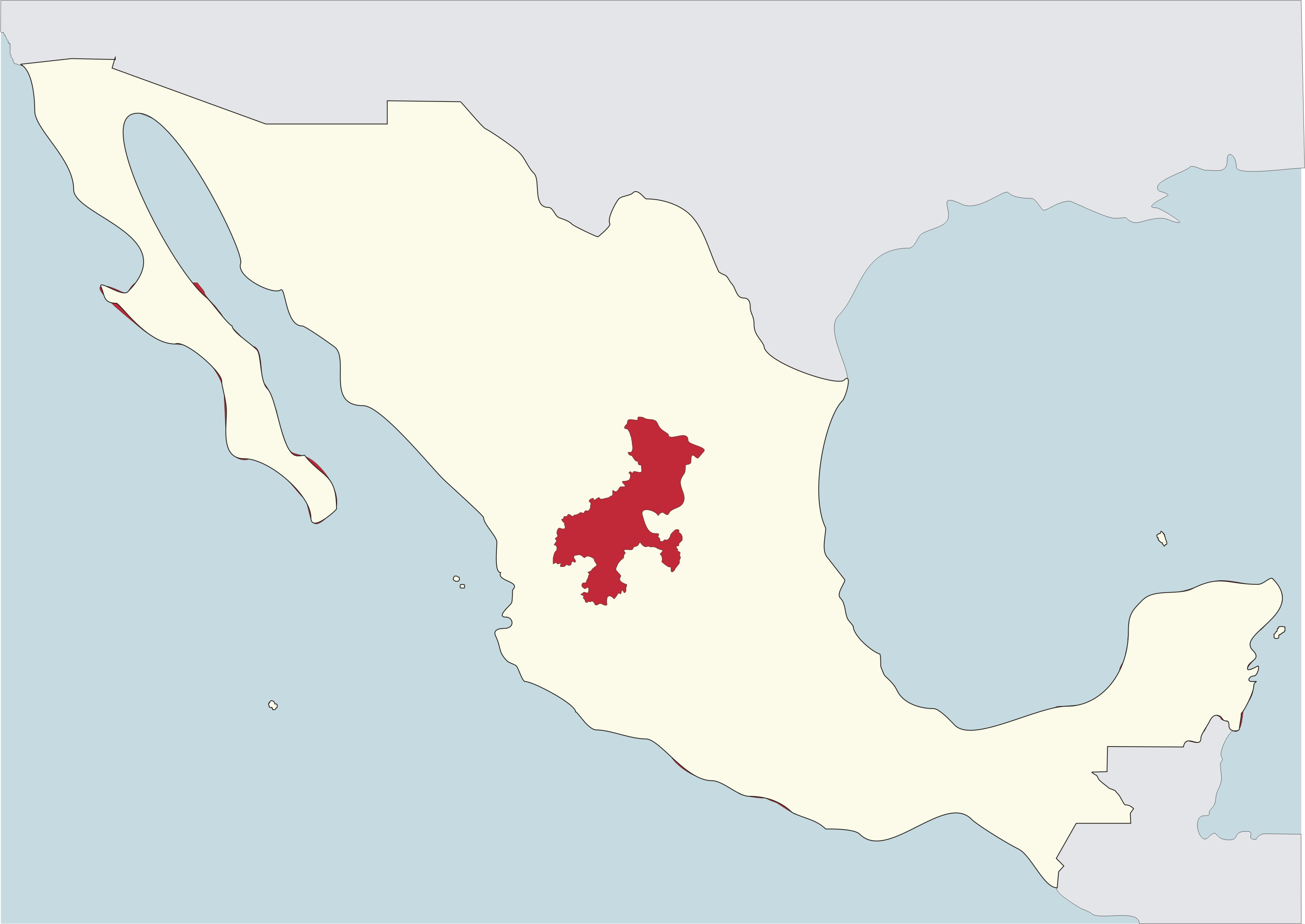

The Catholic Diocese of Zacatecas (Latin: Dioecesis Zacatecensis) (erected 26 January 1863) is suffragan diocese to the Archdiocese of San Luis Potosí, in Mexico. Until 25 November 2006 it was a suffragan of the Archdiocese of Guadalajara, in Guadalajara, Mexico, .

According to an official news release from the Holy See Press Office's Vatican Information Service (VIS), on August 2, 2012, Pope Benedict XVI appointed Sigifredo Noriega Barceló as the fifteenth Bishop of Zacatecas, transferring him from his post as the first Bishop of Ensenada in Ensenada, Mexico, a suffragan diocese in the Ecclesiastical Province of Tijuana in Tijuana, Mexico. Bishop Sigifredo Noriega Barceló was born in Granados, Sonora, Mexico, on October 12, 1951. He attended a Minor Seminary in the Roman Catholic Diocese of Ciudad Obregon, Mexico, then studied Philosophy in the Seminary of Montezuma in the United States. The Bishop then studied Theology in the Diocesan Seminary of Tijuana. Later he obtained a Licentiate in Sacred Theology Degree in Moral Theology from the Alphonsian Academy in Rome. He was then incardinated in the Diocese of Ciudad Obregón and was ordained a priest on October 7, 1976. As a priest, he held the following positions: priest, spiritual director and vice-rector of the minor seminary, prefect of studies in the Major Seminary, diocesan promoter of vocations, member of the Presbyteral Council, the College of Consultors, of the Council of Administration of the University of La Salle, diocesan assessor for the Family. Then, from 2006 to 2007, Fr Noriega served as Vicar General of the diocese. Then, on January 26, 2007, he was appointed the first Bishop of Ensenada, Mexico, and received Episcopal Ordination on 25 April 2007.

== Bishops ==
=== Ordinaries ===
- Ignacio Mateo Guerra y Alba (1864–1871)
- José Maríe del Refugio Guerra y Alva (1872–1888)
- Buenaventura del Purísimo Corazón de María Portillo y Tejeda, O.F.M. (1888–1899)
- José Guadalupe de Jesús de Alba y Franco, O.F.M. (1899–1910)
- Miguel María de la Mora y Mora (1911–1922), appointed Bishop of San Luis Potosí
- Ignacio Placencia y Moreira (1922–1951), Archbishop (personal title)
- Francisco Javier Nuño y Guerrero (1951–1954), appointed Coadjutor Archbishop of Guadalajara, Jalisco
- Antonio López Aviña (1955–1961), appointed Archbishop of Durango
- Adalberto Almeida y Merino (1962–1969), appointed Archbishop of Chihuahua
- José Pablo Rovalo Azcué, S.M. (1970–1972), resigned
- Rafael Muñoz Nuñez (1972–1984), appointed Bishop of Aguascalientes
- Javier Lozano Barragán (1984–1997)
- Fernando Mario Chávez Ruvalcaba (1999–2008)
- Carlos Cabrero Romero (2008–2012), appointed Archbishop of San Luis Potosí
- Sigifredo Noriega Barceló (since 2012)

=== Coadjutor bishop ===
- Francisco Javier Nuño y Guerrero (1951)

== Territorial losses ==
Year	Along with	To form
1962	Diocese of Colima; Archdiocese of Durango	Territorial Prelature of Jesús María (del Nayar)

== Episcopal See ==
- Zacatecas, Zacatecas

== External links and references ==
- "Diocese of Zacatecas". Catholic-Hierarchy.
