= Fernando Mario Chávez Ruvalcaba =

Mexican Roman Catholic prelate (1932–2021)

- Bishop of Zacatecas
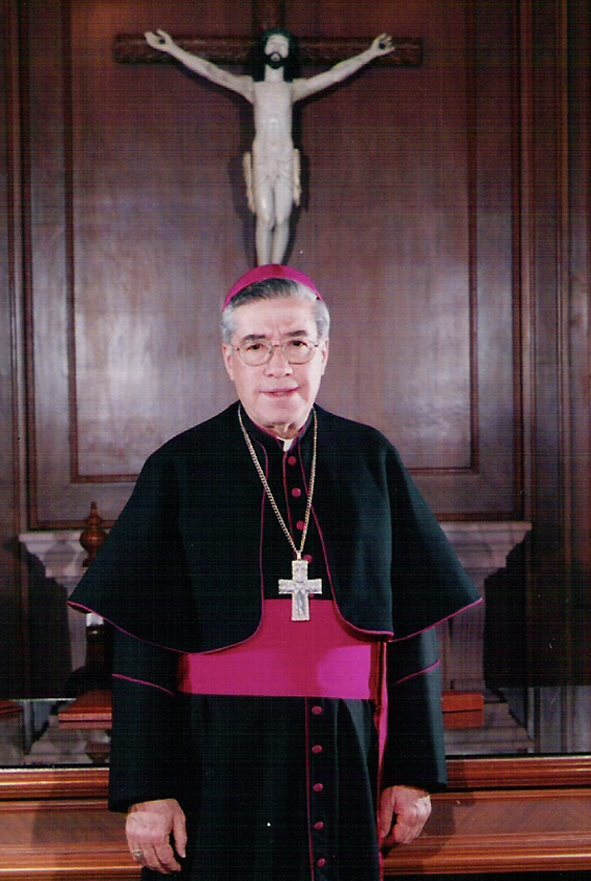
- Church: Latin Church
- Diocese: Diocese of Zacatecas
- Appointed: 20 January 1999
- Retired: 8 October 2008
- Predecessor: Javier Lozano Barragán
- Successor: Jesús Carlos Cabrero Romero

Orders
- Ordination: 23 December 1961 by Antonio Samorè
- Consecration: 20 March 1999 by Justo Mullor García

Personal details
- Born: 30 November 1932 Zacatecas, Mexico
- Died: 15 November 2021 (aged 88) Zacatecas, Mexico

Fernando Mario Chávez Ruvalcaba (30 November 1932 – 15 September 2021) was a Mexican Roman Catholic prelate. He was bishop of Zacatecas from 1999 to 2008. He died due to complications of COVID-19.
