= Cathedral Basilica of Zacatecas =

Church in Zacatecas, Mexico

- Catedral Basílica de la Asunción de María de Zacatecas
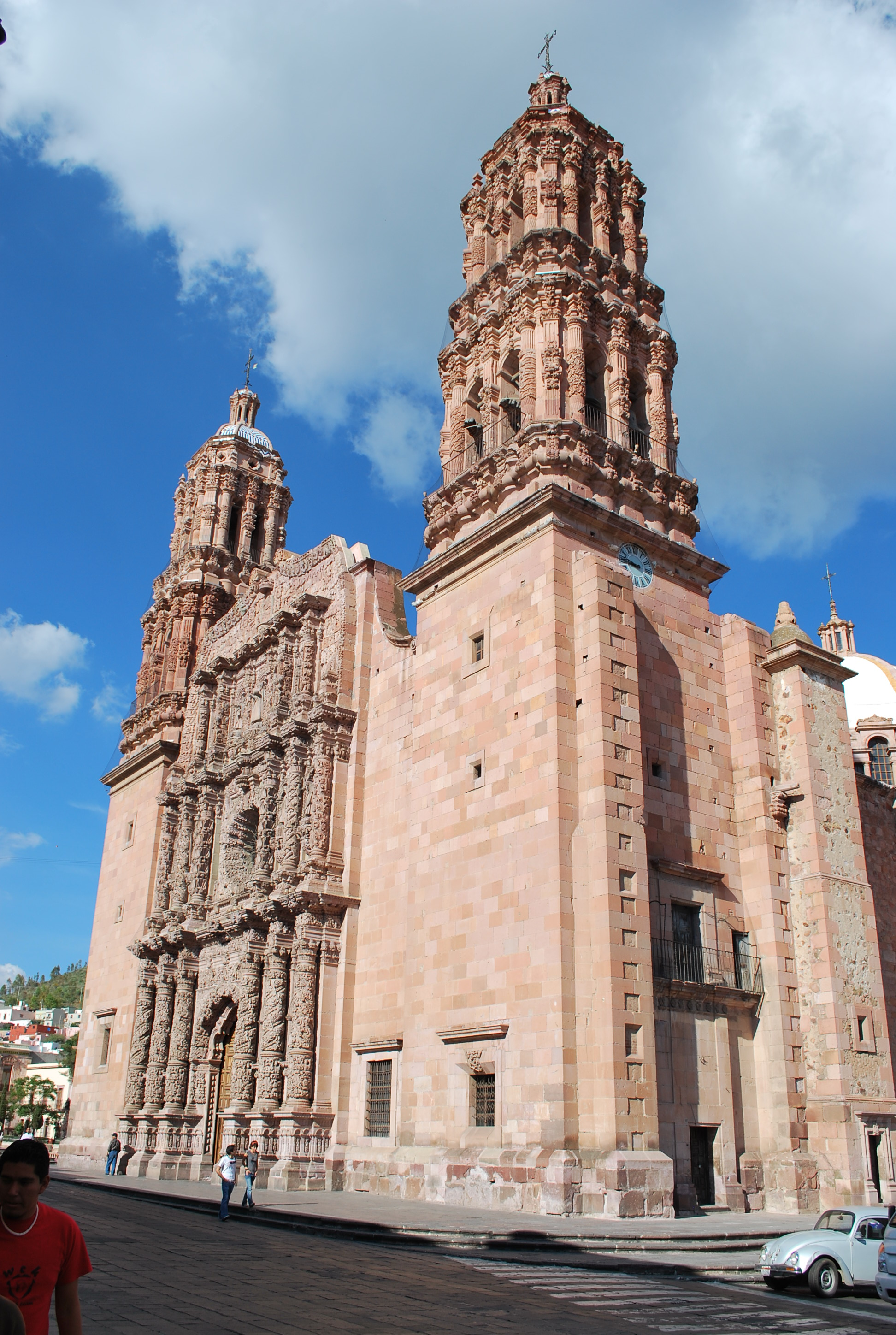
- Cathedral of Zacatecas

Religion
- Affiliation: Roman Catholic
- Diocese: Diocese of Zacatecas
- Ecclesiastical or organisational status: Cathedral and minor basilica
- Year consecrated: 1752; 274 years ago

Location
- Location: Zacatecas, Mexico
- Interactive map of Cathedral Basilica of Zacatecas
- Coordinates: 22°46′32″N 102°34′20″W

Architecture
- Architect: Domingo Ximénez Hernández
- Style: Churrigueresque, New Spanish Baroque, Neoclassical
- Groundbreaking: 1731; 295 years ago
- Completed: (Rest of the church) 1752; 274 years ago (Top of North tower) 1904; 122 years ago
- Spire: 2

UNESCO World Heritage Site
- Official name: Part of the Historic Centre of Zacatecas
- Type: Cultural
- Criteria: ii, iv
- Designated: 1993 (17th session)
- Reference no.: 676
- Region: Latin America and the Caribbean

The Cathedral of Zacatecas, dedicated to the Virgin of the Assumption, is the main temple of the Diocese of Zacatecas. Located in the historic center of the city, declared World Heritage Site by UNESCO.

== History ==
Before the current building there were two temples. The first, was built in the year 1568, as a parish of the city, which was small. A second temple was built in place of the previous one, and it is known that it was consecrated in the year 1625.

It is the result of a construction process that began in 1550 when the plan for the first parish in the city was laid out. After several constructions, additions of chapels and renovations and occasional fires that occurred over 170 years, a definitive project was reached in 1732 that sought to integrate some walls and sculptures of the previous temples to build.

In order to build a larger temple worthy of the city of "the aristocrats of silver", and that would have more space, the walls of the current building were raised in its place. Built mainly between 1731 and 1752, the work was in charge of Domingo Ximénez Hernández. The first stone was laid by Don José de Izarraguirre, episcopal vicar. The work was dedicated in the year 1752 and was consecrated until 1841; It was not completely finished until 1904, the year in which the topped of the "imafronte" and the north tower were completed; this last work carried out by the lyrical master builder Dámaso Muñetón. This tower has a clock donated by Governor Genaro García Rojas.

It possesses three facades, the northern one is dedicated to the Santo Cristo de la Parroquia, considered by the ancient miners as being extremely miraculous; the southern one honours Our Lady of the Zacatecas, patron saint of the city; while the principal one was finished on April, 24 of 1745, this one takes inspiration of the Sacred Communion; in it can be found the representations of the Holy Father, the Son and the Holy Spirit being accompanied by the Apostles, all around the Eucharist, carved in the key of the rosette window.

On January 26, 1863, Pope Pius IX issued the bull that erected the Diocese of Zacatecas, raising the rank of the temple to a cathedral. The third temple, already with three naves, had its baroque wooden altarpieces, which were replaced by quarry ones, possibly designed by the Valencian architect Manuel Tolsá between 1803 and 1847, except for the largest one.

== The building ==
The floor of the building is shaped like a Latin cross. Three naves, the main and two sides, with less than the first. It has two side access covers, worked in stone and with no less detail than the first, the latter, the best finish and detail of Baroque art in the country. The original dome was replaced by the current, which bears a strong resemblance to the Templo de Loreto in Mexico City. It is octagonal, with lantern, surmounted by a wrought iron cross.

The building's exterior is covered with pink stone and are very worked both portals and towers, unlike the interior of sober neoclassical.

=== The main facade ===
Elegant and decorated as a show of lace carved in stone. It consists of three bodies. The first three columns of Corinthian capital, with the stem highly ornamented with angels and plant motifs, mainly vines between each column are located in niches with pedestals that houses the stone carvings of the apostles St. James, St. Peter, St. Paul and St. Andrew. The entrance arch is mixtilineal, is also decorated with reliefs of diamonds, angels and floral motifs.

The second-level houses the window of the choir, of Worth, mixtilineal finishing with moldings and framed by a ring excessively decorated with plant motifs, anthropomorphic and in high relief type key cup and in the corners of it, the four doctors of the Latin Church with their respective attributes, (St. Gregory the Great, St. Jerome, St. Augustine of Hippo and St. Ambrose of Milan, the first two in the top corners and the last two in the bottom corners). Three columns decorated with plants and vines guard the window of the choir. Similarly in the second body between each column is a niche with a pedestal, four in total, with sculptures of saints.

The third, smaller body has five niches flanked by Baroque pilasters, decorated by floral motifs, and holding five sculptures: Four apostles and the central niche is chaired by the sculpture of Jesus Christ.

The pediment of the façade presents a picture of the glory of the Eternal Father, who, one could say, presides over the whole scene.

It is said that the color of façade's stones changes with the sunlight throughout the day, so the best time to observe it is between 14:30 and 18:00 hours.

=== The side portals ===
With two side doorways. The first, north, dedicated to Lord of the parish. It consists of two parts, the first arc of half point, its spandrels have vegetable ornaments and angels, has a copy in stone of a Christ who is inside. On either side figures of caryatids with plant motifs and cherubs. The second body, more elaborate than the first, a set framed by columns stipes with the image of Christ, the Virgin Mary and St. Joseph, with a curtain deployed by angels. Have a shot mixtilineal.

The South portal, dedicated to Our Lady of Zacatecas, whose sculpture is in a niche, this is mentioned to have been sculpted by an artist sentenced to death, he saved his sentence with this sculpture. The facade, with two bodies: the first with arch, flanked by baroque columns, decorated with plant motifs. The second section presents the above image, guarded by two caryatids columns.

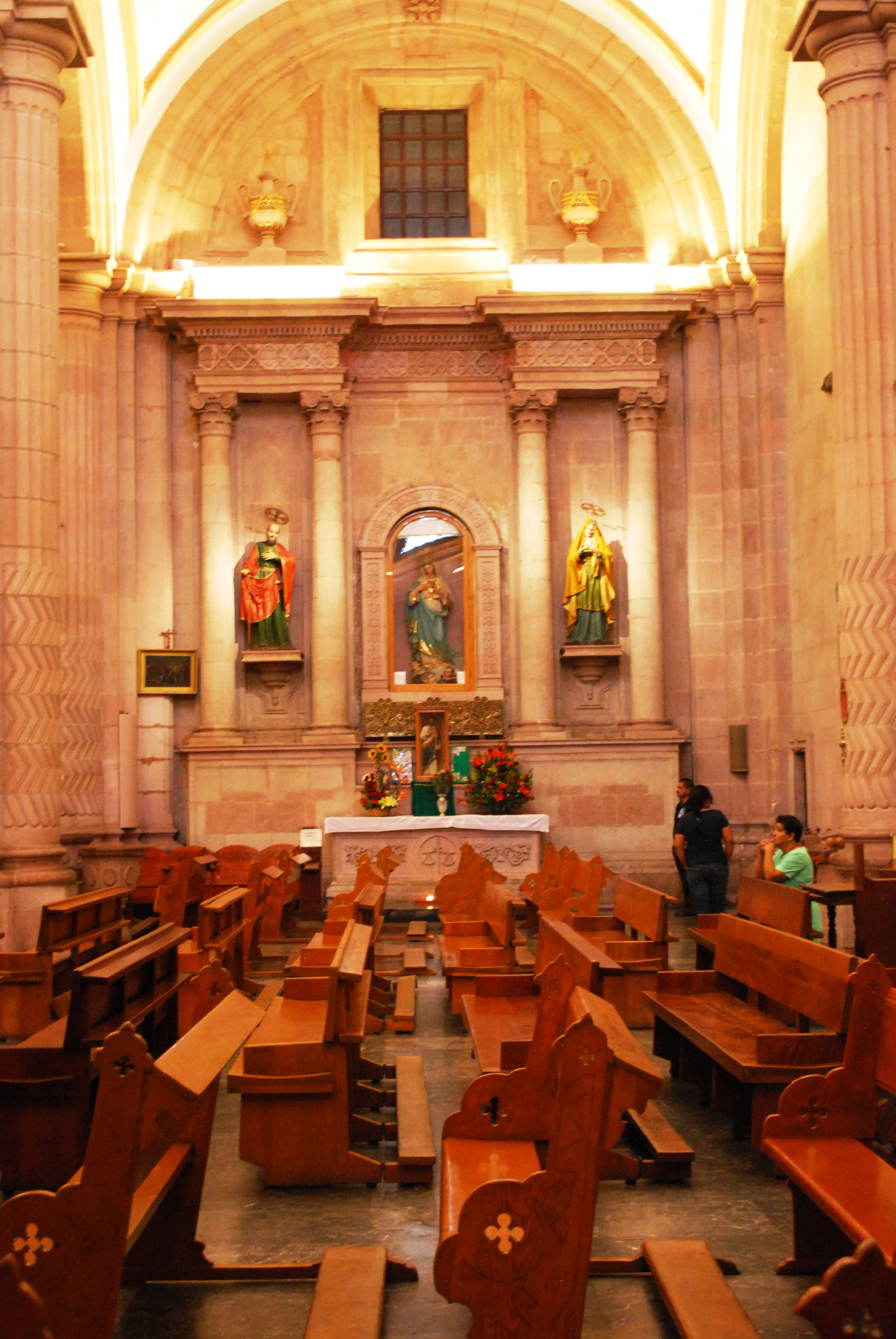
Interior

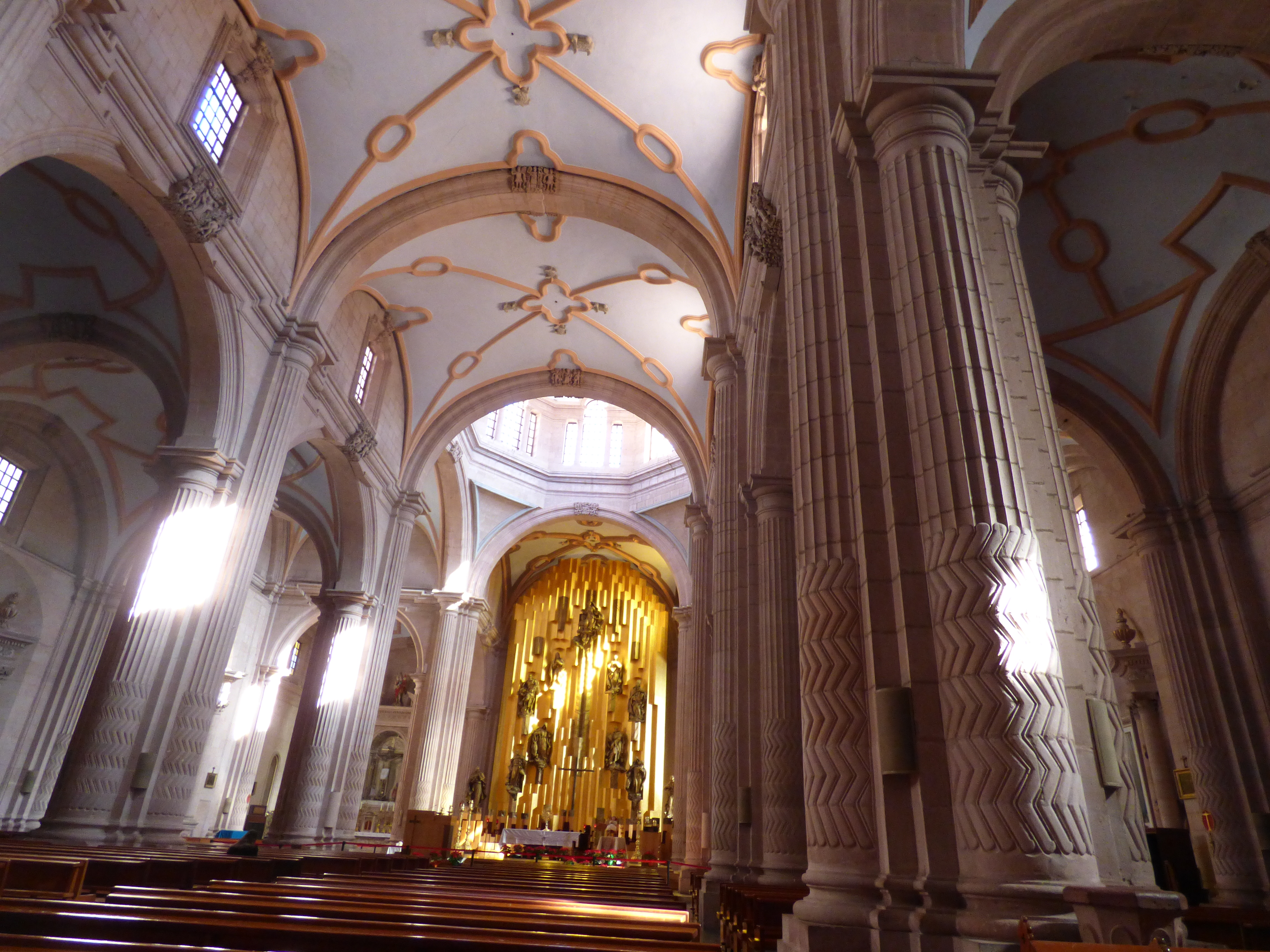
Interior

=== The interior ===
The cathedral's interior bears an austere and functional appearance, which greatly contrasts with its richly decorated exterior. This can be seen with its large Doric columns and neoclassical side altars. On the keys of the arches, there are Marian symbols, figures of saints, evangelist, clergy and objects of passion.

The cathedral contains an altar designed by artist Javier Marín from Michoacan, which is gilded in 24-carat gold. It is 17 feet high and ten wide and covered with 25 kg (55 lb) of gold from Mazapil. It was constructed from geometric prisms born of the upper platform of the sanctuary and contains niches where elaborate images of saints are placed. It weighs about 20 tons and is made of Finnish birch, a very hard wood that neither expands or shrinks, as it does not react to changes in humidity. The altarpiece has eleven images. At the top is the Virgin of the Assumption, who is consecrated the temple. On both sides are the parents of the Virgin, Santa Ana and San Joaquin. In the lower part are San Juan Bautista, San Agustin, Santo Domingo, San Antonio de Padua and San Ignacio de Loyola. On the sides were placed images of the martyrs San Mateo Correa and Blessed Miguel Agustín Pro. The cross is made of bronze and measures 4.2 meters high and two meters wide.

=== Main altarpiece ===
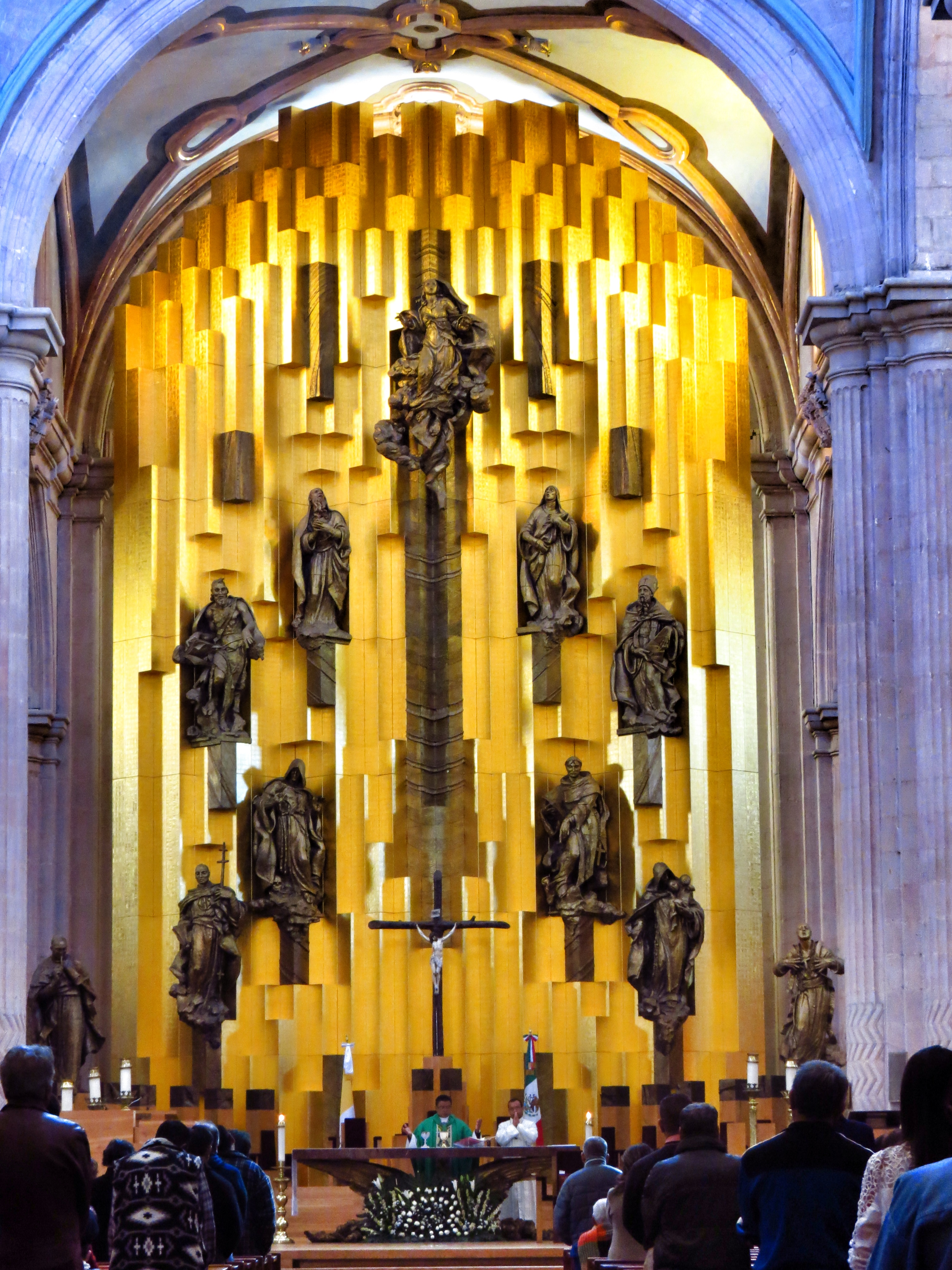
The new altarpiece

The third temple, already with three naves, had its Baroque wooden altarpieces, which were replaced by quarry ones, possibly designed by the Valencian architect Manuel Tolsá between 1803 and 1847, except for the largest one, which is said to have been dismantled in 1852. thus causing an architectural and liturgical vacuum.

Subsequently, a first cypress was built in this same year, which remained until 1895, which was later replaced by a second smaller one, thus giving rise to the concern to cover the front wall with an allegorical painting of the Assumption of the Virgin, a work carried out by Master Manuel Pastrana. In 1920 this Painting was removed, leaving only the Carrara marble cypress placed in 1913 as a liturgical setting. Finally, in 1964 said cypress was removed along with the polychrome of the entire interior.

Finally, the construction of a new altarpiece for the main altar, designed by the Michoacán artist Javier Marín, was started and was completed in 2010. The altar is all covered with 24-carat gold leaf. It is 17 meters high and ten meters wide, covered by 25 kilos of this metal, extracted from the bowels of the semi-desert in Zacatecas (Mazapil, Zac.). It was built from geometric prisms born from the high platform of the presbytery, which create spaces in the form of niches where the elaborate images of the saints sit. It weighs about 20 tons and is made of Finnish birch, a very resistant wood that neither expands nor shrinks, since it does not react to changes in humidity. The altarpiece has eleven images. At the top is the Virgin of the Assumption, to whom the temple is consecrated. On its two sides are the parents of the Virgin, Saint Anne and Saint Joachim. At the bottom are Saint John the Baptist, Saint Augustine, Saint Francis, Saint Dominic, Saint Anthony of Padua, and Saint Ignatius of Loyola. On the sides were placed the images of the Zacatecas martyrs San Mateo Correa and Blessed Miguel Agustín Pro. The cross was made in bronze "lost wax" and measures 4.2 meters high and two meters wide.

== Gallery ==
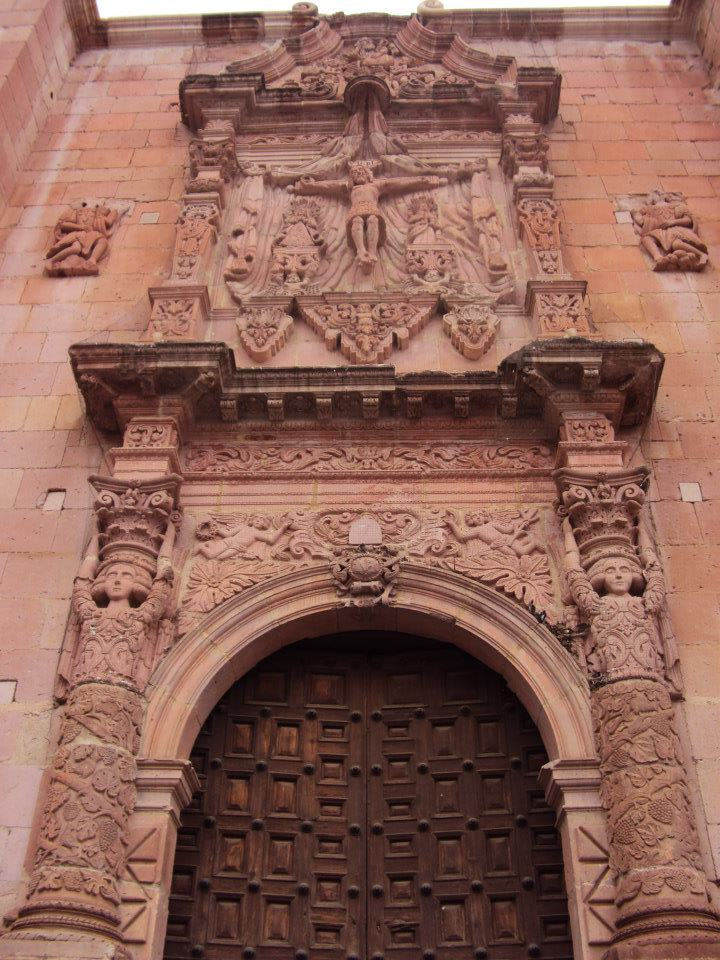
A side portal

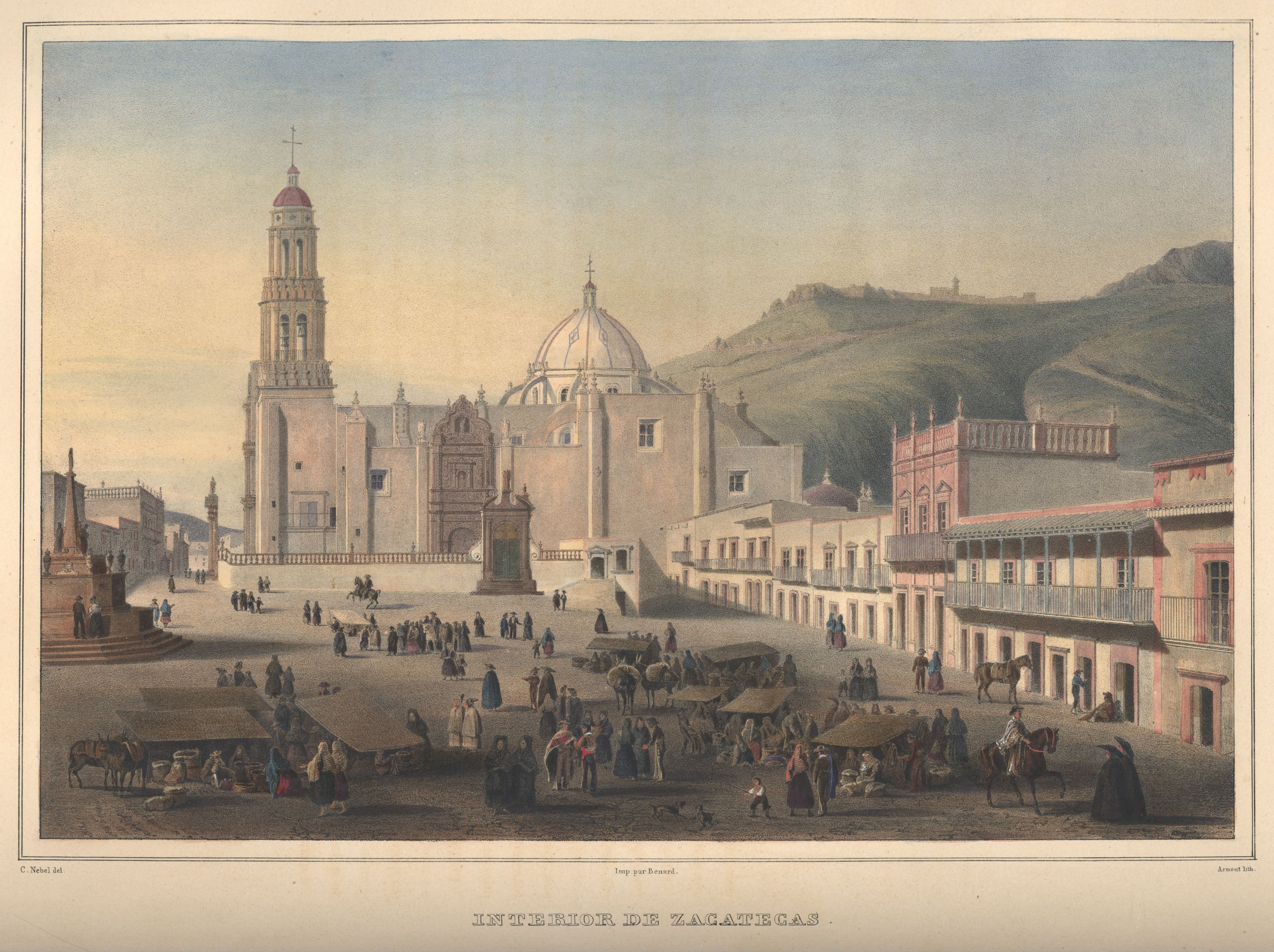
The Zacatecas Cathedral, painting of 1836 by Carl Nebel and Jean-Baptiste Arnout.

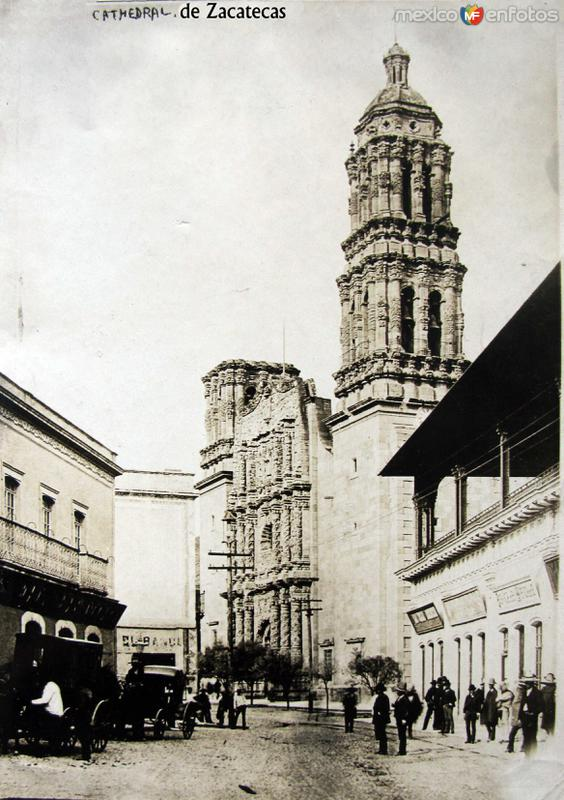
Zacatecas Cathedral as seen from 1752. Photo of 1880.

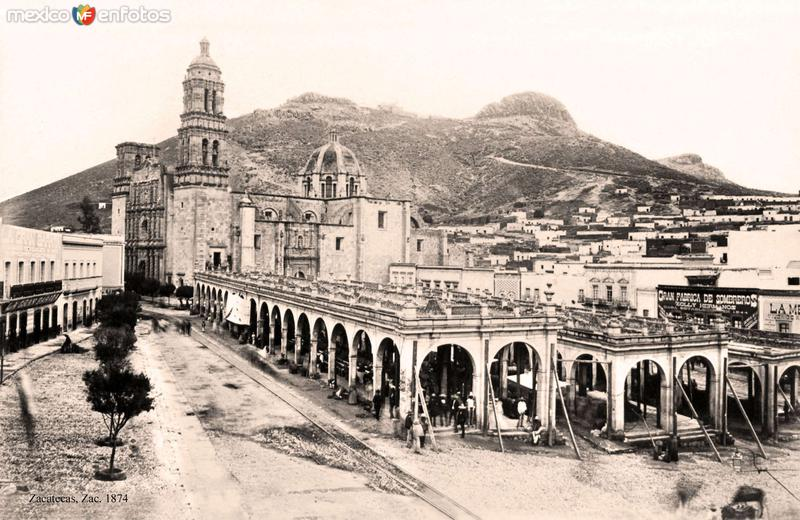
Zacatecas Cathedral as seen from 1752. Photo of 1880.

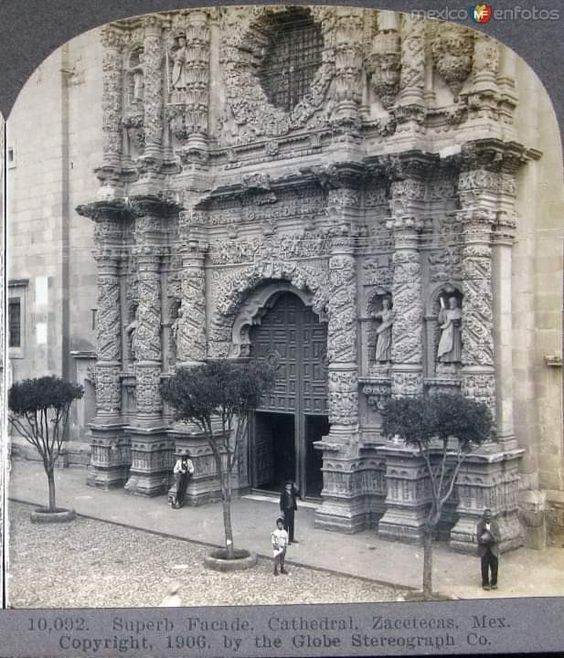
Main portal of the Cathedral in 1906 by the Globe Stereograph Co.

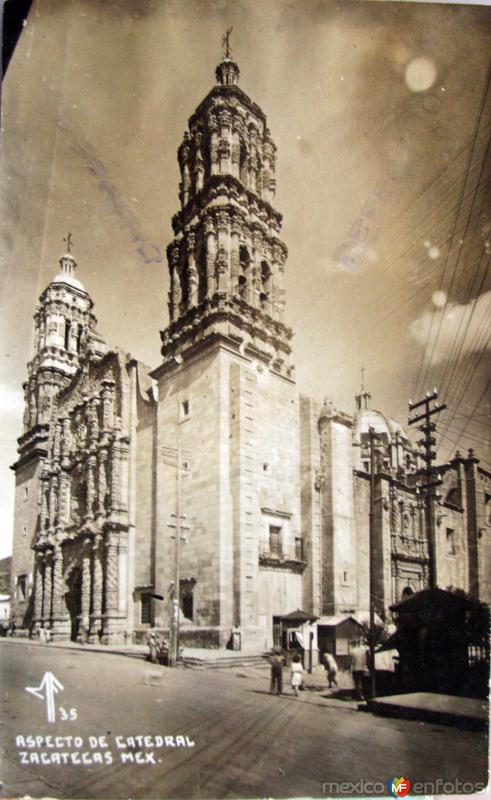
Zacatecas Cathedral with its recently completed North tower, 1904.

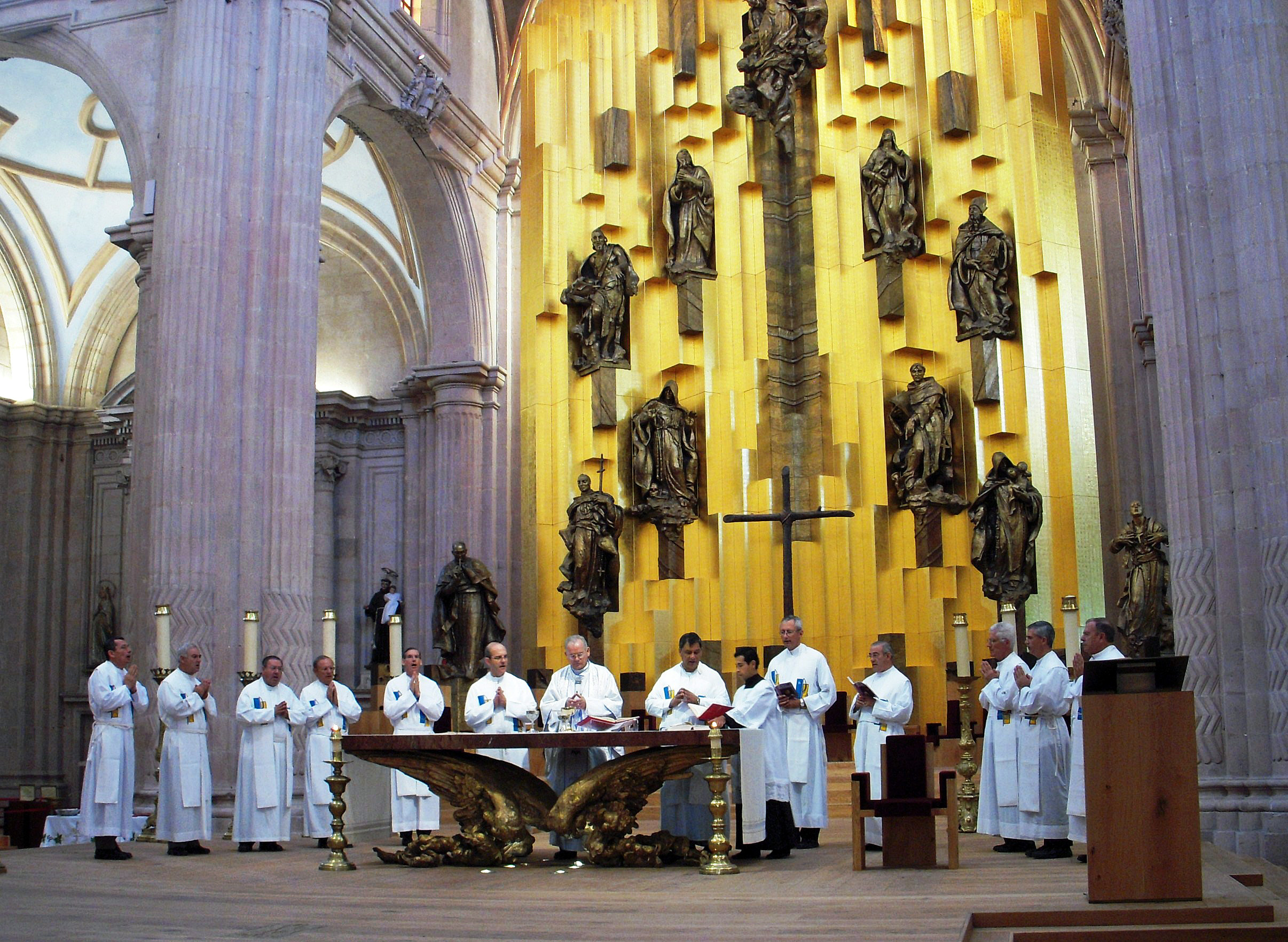
Mass at the Cathedral Basilica, 2010

== See also ==
- Atrial cross
