= Dolentium hominum =

1985 motu propium of the Catholic Church

Dolentium hominum is a Latin motu propium from John Paul II, dated 11 February 1985. It gave papal permission to erect the Pontifical Council for the Pastoral Care of Health Care Workers.

== Text ==
First Sentence: Dolentium hominum Ecclesia semper diligentissimam curam commonstravit; qua in re nihil plane aliud fecit nisi praeclarum Conditoris sui ac Magistri secuta est exemplum. Etiam Nos igitur in Epistula Apostolica, quam hoc ipso die ante annum foras dedimus cuique titulum indidimus: “Salvifici Doloris”, luculenter profecto docuimus: “Christus opera messianica sua inter Israelis populum sine intermissione accessit ad ambitum humani doloris.

== Context ==
In 1985 Pope John Paul II gave the instruction to publish this motu propium. It concerns the pastoral care for the wounded, sick, suffering and mentally ill, including matters of euthanasia.
