= San Michele Arcangelo a Pietralata =

- Church of Saint Michael the Archangel in Pietralata
- Chiesa di San Michele Arcangelo a Pietralata
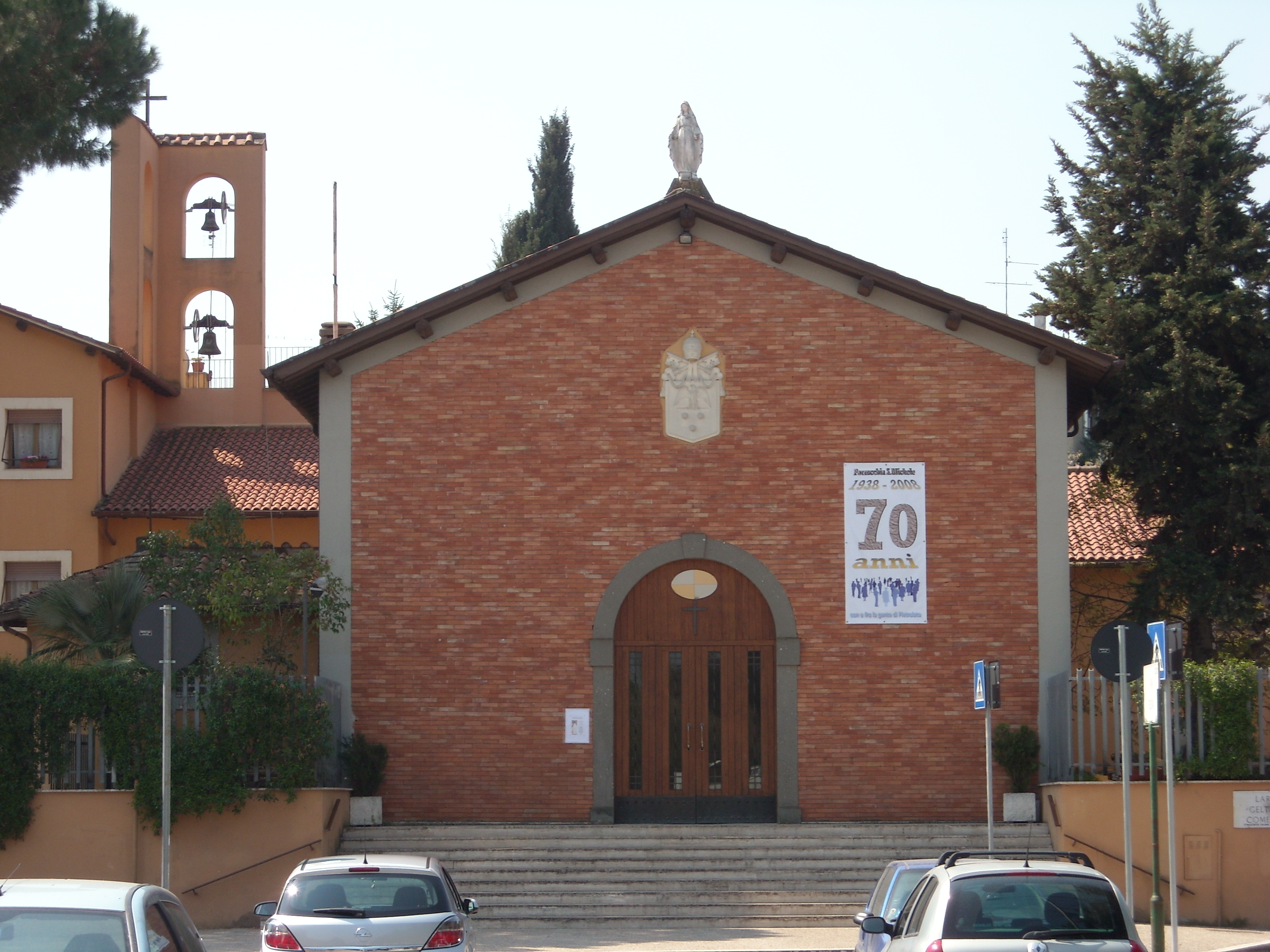

- Location within Rome
- 41°55′03″N 12°33′01″E
- Location: Largo Geltrude Comensoli 6, Pietralata, Rome
- Country: Italy
- Language: Italian
- Denomination: Catholic
- Tradition: Roman Rite
- Website: sanmicheleapietralata.it

History
- Status: titular church, parish church
- Dedication: Saint Michael
- Consecrated: 25 September 1948

Architecture
- Functional status: active
- Architect: Tullio Rossi
- Architectural type: Rationalist
- Groundbreaking: 1938
- Completed: 1948

Administration
- Diocese: Rome

San Michele Arcangelo a Pietralata is a 20th-century parochial church and titular church in eastern Rome, dedicated to Michael the Archangel.

== History ==
San Michele Arcangelo a Pietralata was built in 1937–48; its construction was interrupted by the Second World War. It is built in red-orange brick, with the arms of Pope Pius XII displayed on the facade.

On 5 February 1965, it was made a titular church to be held by a cardinal-deacon.

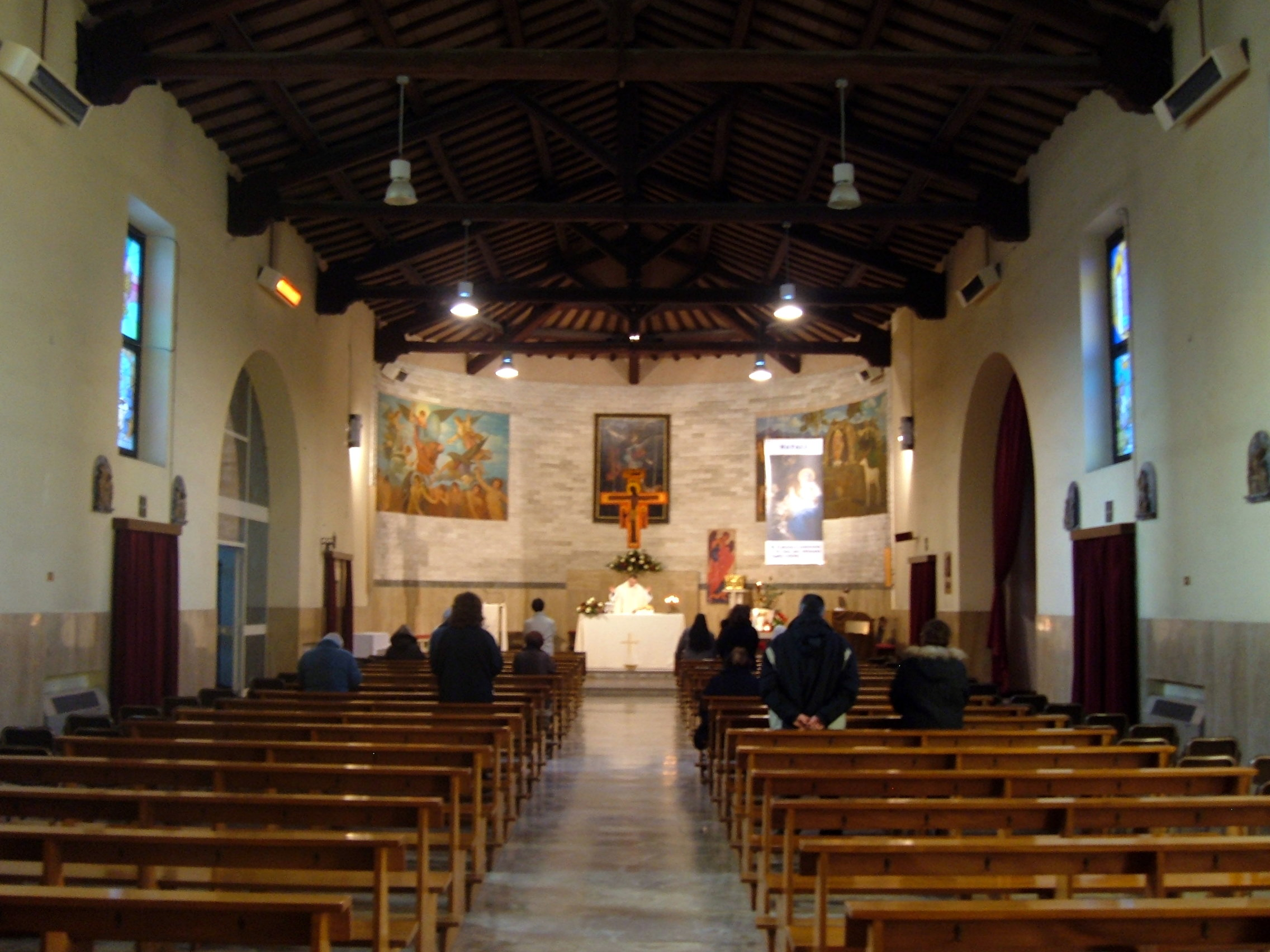
Interior view

In 1991 it was visited by Pope John Paul II. In 2015, the church was visited by Pope Francis. The visit attracted attention when the Pope also visited a refugee encampment 300 m (330 yd) away from the church.

Cardinal-Protectors

- Joseph Cardijn (1965–1967)
- Javier Lozano Barragán (2003–2014)
- Michael Czerny (2019–present)
