= Rafael Muñoz Núñez =

Rafael Muñoz Núñez (January 24, 1925 – February 19, 2010) was the bishop of the Roman Catholic Diocese of Aguascalientes in Mexico. Ordained on March 24, 1951, Muñoz Núñez was appointed bishop of the Roman Catholic Diocese of Zacatecas on July 20, 1972, and was ordained on September 29, 1972. He was appointed bishop of the Aguascalientes diocese on June 1, 1984, retiring on May 18, 1998.
