= Renaud Sainsaulieu =

French sociologist (1935-2002)

Renaud Sainsaulieu (4 November 1935 – 26 July 2002) was a French sociologist specializing in the sociology of organizations. He was noted for promoting sociology outside academia. He was the director of the Centre d'Etudes Sociologiques (Center for Sociological Studies) at the Centre National de la Recherche Scientifique (CNRS) (National Center for Scientific Research); and founded the Laboratoire de Sociologie du Changement des Institutions (LSCI) (Laboratory of Sociology for Institutional Change).

Sainsaulieu was born in Paris, where he lived his entire live, and died there. He was educated at a Jesuit secondary school, and he received his law degree and psychology degree from the Sorbonne.

In 1975, Sainsaulieu became a professor of sociology at the Institut d'Études Politiques de Paris. He was an active member of the Association Internationale des Sociologues de Langue Française (International Association of French Speaking Sociologists), and served as its president from 1992 to 1996.

== Sources ==
- Alter, Norbert and Dominique Martin. "Sainsaulieu, Renaud (1935–2002)" in Ritzer, George (ed.) (2007) Blackwell Encyclopedia of Sociology Blackwell Publishing, Malden, MA, ISBN 978-1-4051-2433-1, Blackwell Reference Online, accessed 31 December 2008
