= World Movement of Christian Workers =

Catholic trade union

The World Movement of Christian Workers (Mouvement Mondial des Travailleurs Chrétiens) is the Catholic Church's officially recognized association for Catholic workingmen and women. It is a member organization of Vatican's Conference of International Catholic Organizations. The World Movement of Christian Workers (WMCW/MMTC) does not have individual members but is a federation of various national movements. The organization in the United States is the Catholic Labor Network. In the UK, it is the Movement of Christian Workers.

WMCW/MMTC activities are educational and evangelistic. The Movement bases its commitment on faith in Jesus Christ, the Gospel and the social teaching of the Catholic Church. It is committed to working together with others - regardless of race, culture or creed - to improve their living conditions and build up a society without exclusions. The approach used by the Movement is based on the method developed by Joseph Cardijn to "see-judge-act".

The world headquarters of the Movement is in Brussels, Belgium. French is the working language of the headquarters.

== History ==
Prior to World War II, in many European countries there developed different labor federations for Catholics, Socialists, Communists and liberals. All of these unions were abolished by the Nazi or other far-right regimes in Axis Europe. The Vatican and others believed this division in the labor movement weakened its ability to defeat Nazism and other far-right totalitarian movements. After World War II, the Vatican discouraged re-formation of "Christian trade unions" (i.e. Catholic aligned labor unions) although it was not always successful. As an alternative to Catholic-based unions that negotiated contracts and represented workers to management, Christian worker associations were created as an educational, spiritual and social action movement rather than as a specific labor union. In the 1950s, the Catholic workers’ associations of Austria, Belgium, France, Germany, Switzerland and the Netherlands decided to join forces to create an international structure to encourage exchanges and knowledge between individuals and different situations; to stimulate solidarity between workers’ movements; to foster the spread of Christian workers’ movements in the world; and to develop the apostolate in the labor world. In 1966, to coincide with the 75th anniversary of Rerum Novarum, it was given official recognition by the Holy See.
