= Fiorenzo Angelini =

Italian Roman Catholic cardinal

His Eminence Fiorenzo Angelini
- President Emeritus of the Pontifical Council for Pastoral Assistance to Health Care Workers
- See: Santo Spirito in Sassia
- Appointed: 16 February 1985 (Pro-President)
- Term ended: 31 October 1996
- Predecessor: None
- Successor: Javier Lozano Barragán
- Other post: Cardinal-Priest of Santo Spirito in Sassia
- Previous posts: Official of the Roman Curia (1956–1977); Titular Bishop of Messene (1956–1985); Auxiliary Bishop of Rome (1977–1985); Titular Archbishop of Messene (1985–1991)

Orders
- Ordination: 3 February 1940
- Consecration: 29 July 1956 by Giuseppe Pizzardo
- Created cardinal: 28 June 1991
- Rank: Cardinal-Priest

Personal details
- Born: 1 August 1916 Rome, Italy
- Died: 22 November 2014 (aged 98) Rome, Italy
- Denomination: Roman Catholic
- Motto: evangelizo pacem evangelizo bonum
- Coat of arms

Fiorenzo Angelini (1 August 1916 – 22 November 2014) was an Italian cardinal of the Roman Catholic Church. He served as the President of the Pontifical Council for the Pastoral Care of Health Care Workers in the Roman Curia, and was elevated to the cardinalate in 1991. When Cardinal Ersilio Tonini died on 28 July 2013, Cardinal Angelini became the oldest living cardinal until the next consistory where Pope Francis appointed 98-year-old Archbishop Loris Francesco Capovilla as a cardinal.

== Biography ==
Born in Rome, Angelini studied at the Pontifical Roman Seminary, Pontifical Lateran University, and Pontifical Theological Faculty Marianum before being ordained to the priesthood on 3 February 1940. He did pastoral work in Rome until 1956, and served as a chaplain in Azione Cattolica from 1945 to 1959. Angelini served as Master of Pontifical Ceremonies from 1947 to 1954, and for a few months he was a delegate for Roman hospitals.

On 27 June 1956, he was appointed Titular Bishop of Messene by Pope Pius XII. Angelini received his episcopal consecration on 29 July from Cardinal Giuseppe Pizzardo, with Archbishop Luigi Traglia and Bishop Ismaele Castellano serving as co-consecrators. He founded, in 1959, the Italian Catholic Doctors' Association, and attended the Second Vatican Council (1962–1965). On 6 January 1977, Pope Paul VI named him an Auxiliary Bishop of Rome. Pope John Paul II raised him to the rank of Archbishop and appointed him as the first president of the newly created Pontifical Council for the Pastoral Care of Health Care Workers on 16 February 1985. He was created Cardinal-Deacon of Santo Spirito in Sassia by John Paul II in the consistory of 28 June 1991.

Due to his responsibility for the health of the Vatican (head of the Pontifical Council for the Pastoral Care of Health Care Workers, 1985–1996), which made him the leader of 3,000 institutions in Italy alone, Angelini (nicknamed Sua Sanità) was involved in the Tangentopoli bribery scandal of the early 1990s. Accusations against him included the forced acceptance of his own people for public commissions, as well as extortion from a pharmaceutical company. Angelini was not prosecuted, due to the Vatican's extraterritorial privileges granted by the Lateran Pacts. Angelini was near to Giulio Andreotti, a Christian Democracy (DC) politician who was several times Prime Minister of Italy, and whose entourage fell from power in the same period by similar scandals (Andreotti himself was put on trial for associations with the mafia). Angelini celebrated the marriage of the daughter of Paolo Cirino Pomicino, another DC politician involved in the bribery scandals; the marriage was attended, amongst others, by Andreotti, Gianni De Michelis (also put on trial in the Tangentopoli scandal) and minister Francesco De Lorenzo, who was condemned to 5 years imprisonment for bribery in the management of Italy's Public Health sector.

Angelini lost his right to vote in papal conclaves when he turned 80 on 1 August 1996. He retired as President of Pastoral Care of Health Care Workers on 31 December 1996, and on 26 February 2002, he exercised the right of becoming a cardinal priest after ten years as a cardinal deacon. Angelini has called for the opening of a cause for the beatification of French geneticist Jérôme Lejeune.

In 1997, Angelini formed the International Institute for Research on the Face of Christ in Rome in association with the Sisters of the Reparation of the Holy Face.

On 28 July 2013, day of the death of cardinal Ersilio Tonini, he became the oldest cardinal in the world. However, Loris Francesco Capovilla, who was elevated to cardinal on 22 February 2014, was older.

== Angelini and Pope Pius XII ==
Angelini was a lifelong admirer of the late Pope Pius XII. In 1959, Angelini published the medical theological pronouncement of the late Pope, the only systematic compilation of the medical speeches and positions of Pope Pius XII, in Pio XII Discorsi Ai Medici and went on to champion his cause for canonization. Angelini was appointed bishop by Pius XII in 1956, but did not get the galero (red hat) until 1991. In a 1992 sermon in Saint Peter Basilica on the anniversary of the death of the pontiff, Angelini stated that his career had suffered because of his positive views of Pope Pius XII.

Catholic Church titles
New office	President of Pontifical Council for the Pastoral Care of Health Care Workers; 1985–1996	Succeeded by Javier Lozano Barragán
Records
Preceded by Ersilio Tonini	Oldest living Member of the Sacred College; 28 July 2013 – 22 February 2014	Succeeded by Loris Francesco Capovilla
