= Young Christian Workers =

International organization

The Young Christian Workers (YCW; French: Jeunesse ouvrière chrétienne) is an international youth organization founded by the Catholic priest Joseph Cardijn in Belgium as the Young Trade Unionists. The organization adopted its present name in 1924. Is it regarded as the most influential wing of the Catholic Action movement.

Its French acronym, JOC, gave rise to the then widely used terms Jocism and Jocist. In 1925, the JOC received papal approbation, and in 1926 spread to France and eventually 48 other countries.

== History ==
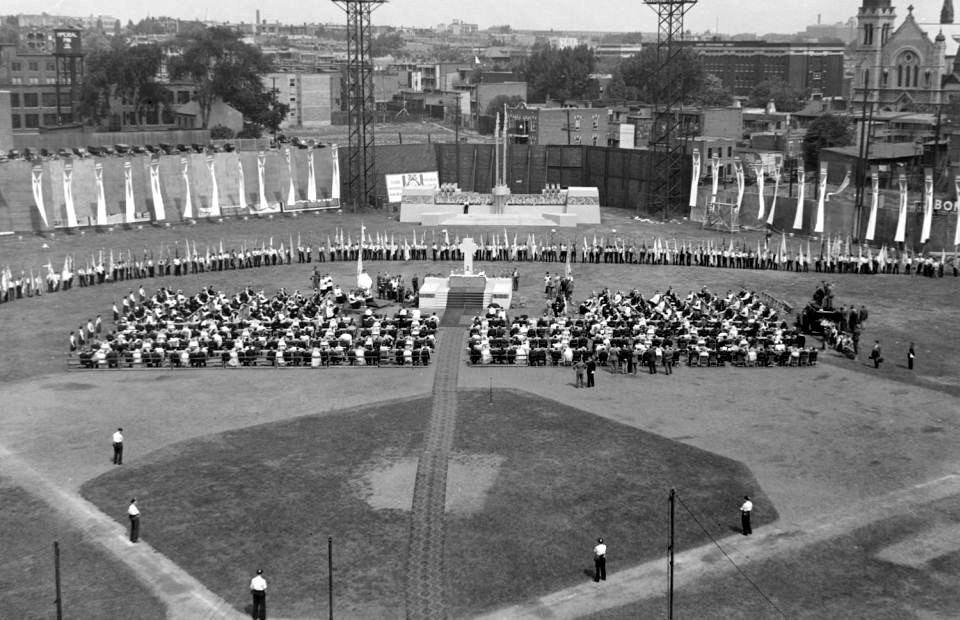
JOC Quebec in 1939

As a young man, Joseph Cardijn blamed the death of his father, a mineworker, on harsh labor conditions. Working-class Belgians of the era tended to see the Church as serving the interests of the aristocracy, and some old friends considered Cardijn a traitor; he thus decided to devote his career to "reconciling his Church with the industrial workers of the world."

After entering seminary and being ordained, Cardijn was first made an assistant priest in the Brussels suburb Royal Laeken in 1912. There, he began to work with factory workers. In 1915, he became the director of the city's Catholic social work. In the years after the First World War, he began to organize young Catholic workers in the Brussels area to evangelize their colleagues; the group was named Jeunesse Ouvrière Chrétienne. Its teachings were based on labor encyclicals by Popes Leo XIII and Pius XI. JOC received approval from Pius XI in 1925.

YCW is regarded as the most influential wing of the Catholic Action movement. Time Magazine, reporting on a Paris rally with 75,000 members in 1938, quoted Cardijn as telling his followers, "Every Jocist has a Divine mission from God, second only to that of the priest, to bring the whole world to Christ."

Cardijn devoted the rest of his life to the movement, and in 1957 the JOC held its first world council in Rome. Cardijn served as an advisor to the Second Vatican Council and was made a cardinal in 1965.

In England, the first section of the YCW was set up by Fr Gerrard Rimmer in February 1937 at St Joseph's Church in Wigan, Lancashire. Accompanied by parishioners Jim Tickle, Tommy Sullivan, Larry Sharkey, Pat Keegan, Jim O'Brien, and Frank Foster, Rimmer travelled to Belgium to visit Cardijn in the same year. Pat Keegan would go on to become the first International Young Christian Workers president in 1945, a post he held until 1957. He then took the role of Secretary General at the World Movement of Christian Workers. Keegan also addressed the assembly of bishops at Vatican II in Rome.

=== Modern era ===
Nowadays the YCW is organized in Europe, Asia, Australia, Africa and the Americas. The international headquarters are located in Brussels, Belgium. The International YCW (IYCW) is a Non Governmental International Movement actively present in over 51 countries with members between the ages of 15 and 35. Thanks to its work with young people, the England branch is a member of The National Council for Voluntary Youth Services (NCVYS).

The IYCW has 4 official branches, the Panafrican YCW, YCW of the Americas, YCW Europe, and YCW Asia Pacific. IYCW adopted "Social Protection for all" as its International Campaign for the next four years in the 12th International Council held in Thanjavur, India, from 29 September to 12 October 2008.

In 2020, at their National Council, the Australian movement distanced itself from an exclusively Christian definition of faith to accommodate common values and shared beliefs from the broader culture. Fr. Joseph's imperative, to "bring the whole world to Christ", is now interpreted as a call to "forge traditions and expressions of spirituality that speak to our multi-cultural and multi-faith identity and to engage in interfaith dialogue in all our communities".
