= Joseph Cardijn =

Belgian Roman Catholic cardinal and founder of the Young Christian Workers

Servant of God Joseph Cardijn
- Cardinal-Deacon of San Michele Arcangelo a Pietralata
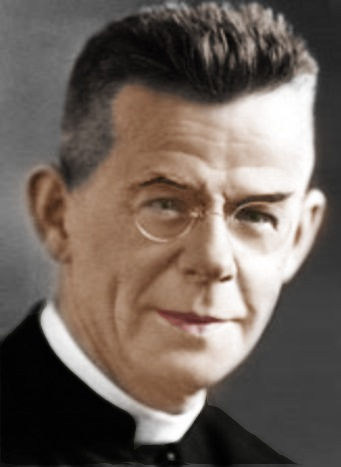
- Church: Roman Catholic Church
- In office: 25 February 1965 – 24 July 1967
- Predecessor: None: titular church created
- Successor: Javier Lozano Barragán
- Previous post: Titular Archbishop of Tusuros (1965)

Orders
- Ordination: 22 September 1906 by Désiré-Joseph Mercier
- Consecration: 21 February 1965 by Leo Joseph Suenens
- Created cardinal: 22 February 1965 by Pope Paul VI
- Rank: Cardinal-Deacon

Personal details
- Born: Joseph Leo Cardijn; 13 November 1882 Schaerbeek, Brussels, Belgium
- Died: 24 July 1967 (aged 84) Leuven, Flemish Brabant, Belgium
- Motto: Evangelizare pauperibus ("To evangelize the poor")

Styles of Joseph Cardijn
- Reference style: His Eminence
- Spoken style: Your Eminence
- Informal style: Cardinal

Joseph Leo Cardijn (Dutch: [ˈjoːzəf ˈleːjoː kɑrˈdɛin]; 13 November 1882 – 24 July 1967) was a Belgian Catholic cardinal and the founder of the movement of Young Christian Workers (Jeunesse ouvrière chrétienne, JOC).

Cardijn was best known for his lifelong dedication to social activism and working towards the improvement of the working class; after his ordination, he made a particular focus of his life the effort to evangelize and bring the core messages of faith in the Gospel back to the working class, who he believed were neglected. He was not wrong in that assessment since old schoolmates working in the mines and mills believed the Church had abandoned them, which prompted Cardijn to found a social movement dedicated to this task despite the opposition that it faced.

His movement received vocal praise and encouragement from Pope Pius XI. He demonstrated great zeal even after he had been imprisoned during World War II, which served to empower his positions on social change and to oppose rising inequalities. Cardijn was also an extensive traveller (visiting places such as Costa Rica and Australia) and was a recipient of several recognitions for his work in social activism. He served as a critical contributor to the Second Vatican Council, working closely with Pope John XXIII and Pope Paul VI. The latter named Cardijn as a cardinal in 1965.

Cardijn died in a Leuven hospital in 1967. The cause for the cardinal's beatification was initiated in 2014 and he is titled as a Servant of God.

== Life ==
=== Childhood and education ===
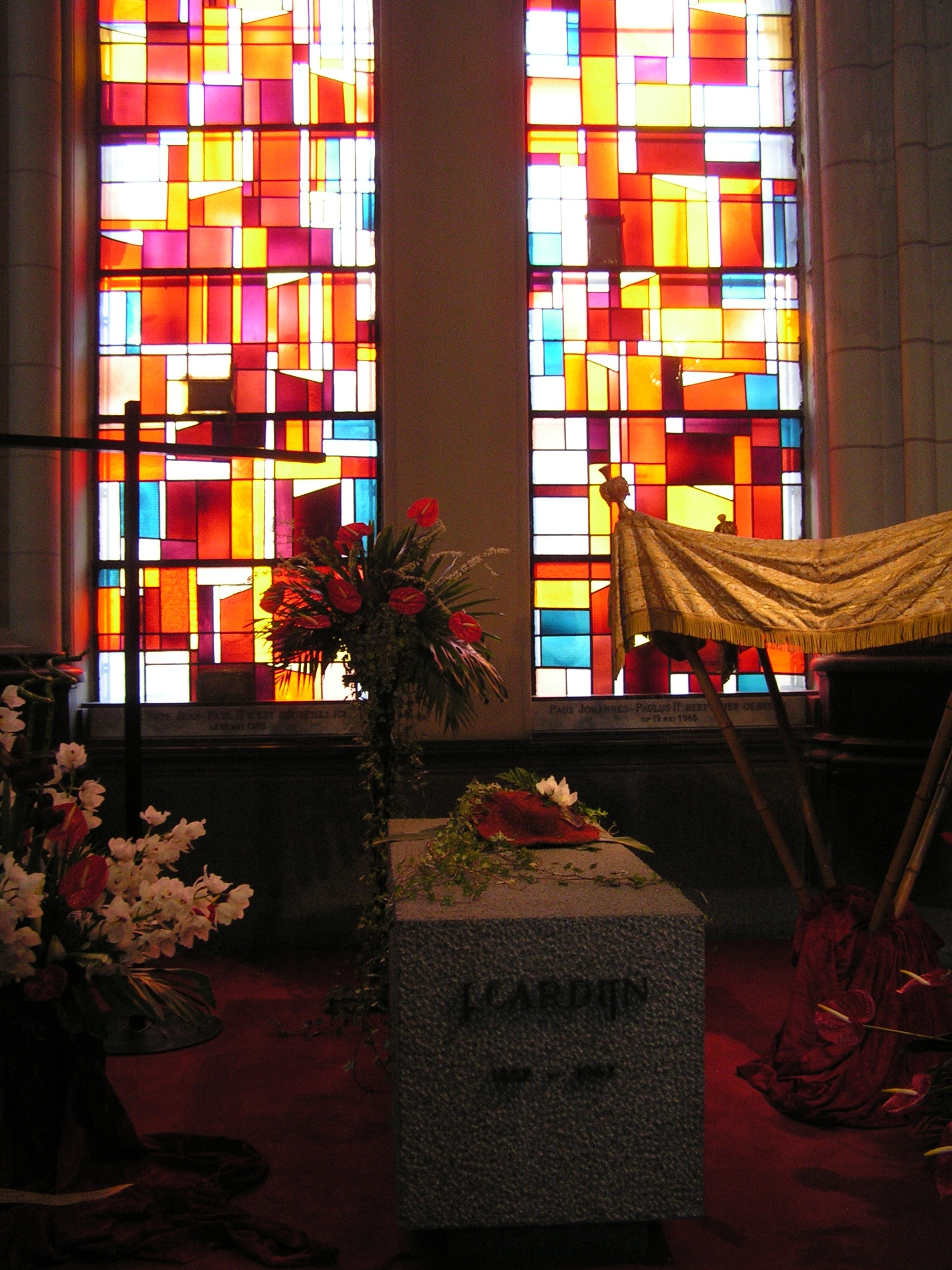
Tomb in Laeken.

Joseph Cardijn was born on 13 November 1882 in Schaerbeek as the second of four children to Henri Hieronimus Cardijn (1840–1903) and Louise Maria Ester Van Daelen (c. 1850–1923). His siblings were: Jeanne (1881–1912), Victor (1884–1908), and Charles (1888–1975). He lived with his grandparents in Halle until his parents quit their jobs as caretakers and his father (who was illiterate) started a business as a coal merchant while his mother opened a café. But he also lived with his grandparents because his mother's frail health meant she could not nurse him. He received his First Communion in 1895. His mother would often gather her children to read scriptural stories to them such as Creation or Pentecost or fairy tales such as Little Red Riding Hood.

Both parents were devout and agreed to let him continue his studies to become a priest instead of going to work. One night in 1895 he went to his shared bedroom with his siblings and then crept downstairs barefoot to the kitchen to the fireside to speak with his parents regarding his desire to become a priest. He pleaded with his father, who relented after two tears fell down his cheeks; Cardijn affirmed: "I've felt within me a call from God. I want to be a priest". He commenced his ecclesial education in 1897. His parents had wanted him to have a good job since it would add to their income and ensure the Cardijns were better off.

He studied in Halle before going in September 1903 to Mechelen for his education; his father died a few months prior to this. During his vacations he visited his old schoolmates working in the mills and the mines. But his old friends scoffed at his desire to become a priest, believing he joined those that oppressed the working class.

=== Priesthood ===
Cardijn was ordained a priest in St. Rumbold's Cathedral on 22 September 1906 by Cardinal Désiré-Joseph Mercier. It was around this time that fellow priest Adolf Daens befriended him, becoming a major influence on Cardijn's life. He had also decided to spend his life evangelizing and bringing the faith back to the working class, who he felt had been neglected.

Mercier sent him to the Université catholique de Louvain on 4 August 1906 for sociological and political sciences education but recalled Cardijin in 1907 for a teaching position in mathematics and literature; he called the position a "providential misfortune". During his vacations he travelled to France and England, where he visited Manchester and London. He became a teacher in Wavre in 1907 and travelled abroad during vacation periods, meeting people such as Baden Powell and Ben Tillett (August 1911). In 1912 (after being ill for a time), he was appointed to the parish of Laeken near Brussels, where he started creating and improving workers' organizations in earnest.

During World War I he was twice imprisoned for so-called patriotic activities. He left Laeken in 1919 and dedicated himself to social work from then on. In August 1914 he gathered food and medicine for soldiers and war victims. He was arrested in November 1916 and sentenced to thirteen months imprisonment on 6 December; his mother suffered a nervous breakdown upon learning of this. Cardijin used his time in prison to read the Bible and Karl Marx and smuggled his writings out of prison. In turn he received books and other materials through the underground. He was arrested again in 1918 on an espionage charge and sentenced to a decade of hard labor, but was released following the November 1918 armistice that ended the war. In 1919 he suffered from tuberculosis due to his imprisonment and was sent to Cannes in France for several months of recuperation before going back to Belgium. In 1919 he started La Jeunesse Syndicaliste ("Young Trade Unionists"). This group at first met resistance from within the Church, but after a while the organization and Cardijn became accepted; in March 1925 Cardijn received a blessing from Pope Pius XI, who encouraged his work. Following their meeting the pope said: "Here at last is someone who comes to speak to me about the masses!" adding that "the Church needs the workers and the workers need the Church". In 1924 Cardijn received permission from Cardinal Mercier to meet the pope, with Clemente Micara (the then nuncio to Belgium) helping to facilitate the March 1925 meeting. The pope blessed the movement and affirmed that "we make it our own!" He and the pope met again in 1927. According to the noted theologian Yves Congar, the pope's approval for Cardijin's movement was reminiscent of Pope Innocent III confirming the Order of Friars Minor for Saint Francis of Assisi centuries prior.

In 1924 the organization's name was changed to Jeunesse Ouvrière Chrétienne (JOC, or "Young Christian Workers"). The organization grew rapidly throughout the world; the movement was often called "Jocism", and its members were often known as "Jocists". In an autographed letter in 1935 the pope backed the Jocistas as an "authentic model" for activism and social action. In 1938 there were 500,000 members throughout Europe; in 1967 this had increased to two million members in 69 different countries. His opponents often called him a communist or a pied piper. In January 1938 he sent a petition to the pope asking for him to initiate the causes of canonization for Margaret Sinclair and Pier Giorgio Frassati.

In 1940 the Gestapo arrested him, but released him from jail in September 1942. He refused to leave unless those captured and jailed alongside him were released with him. The Nazis refused this request and forced his departure from the prison. On 1 September 1944 the Nazis burst into the JOC headquarters to take him prisoner but he learned of this beforehand and fled out the back door to hide. Pope Pius XII made him a Privy Chamberlain of His Holiness on 30 April 1950 and Pope John XXIII later named him as a Protonotary Apostolic on 25 September 1962.

=== Council and cardinal ===
Pope Paul VI announced that he would create Cardijn a cardinal in 1965; he had to first be consecrated as a bishop. He received his episcopal consecration and a week later Paul VI made him Cardinal-Deacon of San Michele Arcangelo a Pietralata. Leo Joseph Cardinal Suenens consecrated him as the Titular Archbishop of Tusuros in the chapel of the Pontificio Collegio Urbano de Propaganda Fide.

Cardijn had first come into contact with Paul VI when the latter was Father Montini serving in the Secretariat of State, and the two started corresponding. When Montini was appointed Archbishop of Milan, Cardijn's concern at losing a supporter and friend within the Secretariat was evident. He likewise expressed his nervousness at the election of John XXIII, since he did not know him and did not know how the new pope would respond to his movement. However, the two soon became good friends, and he was all the more pleased when John XXIII named Montini as a cardinal over a month after his election. In 1963 Montini was elected pope; on 4 November 1963 he sent Cardijn a letter praising his work. In 1964, the pope asked Cardijn to submit his thoughts on ecumenism and dialogue for Ecclesiam Suam. Cardijn gave the pope a ten-page reflection, as well as 40 additional pages of citations he thought would help in the document's drafting.

He participated in the Second Vatican Council. Cardinal Basil Hume (in a 13 November 1982 speech to the Jocists) later noted that the council was Cardijn's "monument" due to the great and lingering contributions he made to it. Cardijn succeeded in ensuring that Apostolicam Actuositatem was named as the "Decree on the Lay Apostolate", rather than the "Decree on the Laity", for he felt the latter title did not address the faithful to an adequate degree. Pope John XXIII had named Cardijin as a member of the Preparatory Commission on Lay Apostolate and had written Mater et Magistra in 1961 based on Cardijn's model for social teaching as well as on his recommendation to commemorate seven decades since Rerum Novarum of Pope Leo XIII. He drafted more than 25 formal detailed notes for the commission advocating his vision for the faithful and these ideas later became incorporated into both Apostolicam Actuositatem and Lumen Gentium. He gave three interventions in the council. One such intervention was made on religious liberties on 20 September 1965.

=== Global visits ===
Cardijn was a frequent traveller around the world. In 1958 he made his first trip to Australia, where he spoke at public rallies in both Melbourne and Adelaide; he returned to Australia once, in 1966, to attend other rallies. He made his first trip to the Americas in June 1946. During this trip he visited Costa Rica. In 1948 he visited Northern Africa. In 1950 he received a distinction of the Légion d'honneur (French Legion of Honour). In 1953, during his first visit to Asia, Cardijn visited India and Sri Lanka, visiting New Delhi and Colombo. He left Belgium on 20 November 1952 and returned on 4 March 1953, having gone first to Beirut and Baghdad, before heading to Karachi. Following India and Sri Lanka he was in Japan and Honolulu, before visiting Chicago and New York, after visiting Washington, D.C. On 24 February 1967 he left for Hong Kong and Japan, on what would be his last international visit.

=== Illness and death ===
Cardijn died due to renal complications on 24 July 1967; his remains were interred in the Notre-Dame parish church in Laeken.

On 19 June 1967 he was stricken with a terrible illness causing great pain; he had once had an operation in 1952, which led some to believe the illness was related to that operation. Cardijn suffered from a high fever and even fell down the stairs several times believing the pain would soon disappear. His diagnosis was not clear at first as his temperature increased, which worried those around him. He was taken to hospital where it was discovered he had a severe renal infection. He knew his time was short and dated his final letter to Paul VI on 25 June 1967. He had an operation in late June and his condition made a slight improvement to the point that he could have a little beer or coffee.

Cardinal Suenens came to the hospital to give him the Anointing of the Sick not long prior to Cardijn's death. On 14 July he lapsed into a coma (also suffering from cardiac weakness); HM King Baudouin came for a long bedside visit despite the cardinal not recognizing him due to the severe nature of his illness. He fell into delirium on 15 July, breaking into fragments of a sermon on Populorum Progressio (a document he hailed upon its release). The nurse tending to him felt his pulse on 24 July noticing that the cardinal had died just moments earlier. The then Prince Albert II attended his funeral. Pope John Paul II visited his tomb on his visit to Belgium in 1985.

== Legacies ==
Cardijn's model ("See, Judge, Act") influenced a number of movements around the world, such as the Young Christian Workers (YCW), Young Christian Students, Christian Family Movement, the Student Catholic Action, the Paulian Association and Palms Australia. In North America his approach was applied in Catholic Action movements. In South America it was adopted as something compatible with the Liberation Theology movement.

In Noarlunga Downs, Australia, the Cardijn College has been named in his honour. The school's motto is adopted from Cardijn's model. In South Africa it was used to support the development of the first black trade unions in Durban in the 1970s.

=== Recognitions ===
The cardinal received several doctorates and recognitions during his career; in 1950 he received a distinction of the Légion d'honneur (French Legion of Honour). His awards include:

- Docteur honoris causa, sciences sociales, économiques et politiques—from Université de Montréal (1947)
- Docteur de l’Université, LL.D. honorifique—from Université d’Ottawa (23 June 1947)
- Unknown—from Universidade Federal do Rio de Janeiro (1948)
- Unknown—from Universidad de Santiago de Chile (1948)
- Unknown—from Universidad de São Paulo (1948)
- Doctor honoris causa—from Université catholique de Louvain (2 February 1951)
- Doctoris honoris causa, Sciences sociales—from Université Laval (23 December 1956)
- Docteur de l'université—from Université de Sherbrooke (23 December 1959)
- Unknown—from Université de Moncton (1962)

== Beatification process ==
In December 2013 the then Archbishop of Mechelen-Brussels André-Joseph Léonard announced that he would launch the cause of beatification for Cardijn. The official request was lodged with the archbishop on 16 December and the archbishop launched the diocesan investigation on 16 January 2014; the cause is ongoing on the diocesan level.

The postulator for the cause was Mr. Guy Tordeur and the vice-postulator was Fr Felix Van Meerbergen.
