= Pontifical Council for the Pastoral Care of Health Care Workers =

Catholic Church organization

The Pontifical Council for the Pastoral Care of Health Care Workers (1985-2017) was a pontifical council set up on 11 February 1985 by Pope John Paul II who reformed the Pontifical Commission for the Pastoral Assistance to Health Care Workers into its new form in 1988. It was part of the Roman Curia.

Effective 1 January 2017, the work of the Council was assumed by the Dicastery for Promoting Integral Human Development.

== Description ==
The Apostolic Constitution Pastor Bonus describes the work of the council as:

- Art. 152 — The Pontifical Council for Pastoral Assistance to Health Care Workers shows the solicitude of the Church for the sick by helping those who serve the sick and suffering, so that their apostolate of mercy may ever more effectively respond to people’s needs.
- Art. 153 — § 1. The Council is to spread the Church’s teaching on the spiritual and moral aspects of illness as well as the meaning of human suffering

Its tasks also include coordinating the activities of different dicasteries of the Roman Curia as they relate to health care. The Pontifical Council explains and defends the teachings of the Church on health issues. The Council also follows and studies programs and initiatives of health care policy at both international and national levels, with the goal of extracting its relevance and implications for the pastoral care of the Church.

== List of presidents ==
- Cardinal Fiorenzo Angelini (16 February 1985 - 31 October 1996)
- Cardinal Javier Lozano Barragán (31 October 1996 - 18 April 2009)
- Archbishop Zygmunt Zimowski (18 April 2009 – 12 July 2016)

== See also ==
- Catholic Church and health care
- Dolentium Hominum
