= Juventutem =

Fœderatio Internationalis Juventutem
- Abbreviation: F.I.J.
- Formation: 24 May 2006; 19 years ago
- Coordinates: 46.938193°N 7.422684°E
- President: Henry Walker
- Affiliations: Roman Catholic Church
- Website: www.juventutem.org

Juventutem (Latin: Fœderatio Internationalis Juventutem) is an international movement of young Roman Catholics of the ages 18 to 39 who are devoted to the Tridentine Mass. The aim of the society is to foster and strengthen relationships between these young people at the national and international levels, and to encourage and assist them in developing their faith.

Father Armand de Malleray FSSP, is the official Chaplain since 2004.

== Origin of name ==
The word juventutem is a declension of the Ecclesiastical Latin juventus, meaning "youth", and is taken from Psalm 42(43):4, as used in the opening prayers of the Traditional Mass, which the priest and altar server recite at the foot of the altar: Introibo ad altare Dei. Ad Deum qui laetificat juventutem meam. ("I will go in to the altar of God; to God who gives joy to my youth.") In the Catholic understanding, the term juventutem refers to the spiritual youth that comes from the grace of Jesus Christ.

== Development ==
Juventutem was established in April 2004 (and first given its name in May 2004) with the intention of having a delegation present at the international World Youth Day in 2005 and in subsequent years. The first Juventutem meeting was in 2005 in Cologne, Germany, and was the first official delegation to any World Youth Day. More than 1,000 young people from more than 20 countries attended World Youth Day 2005 with Juventutem. Two cardinals and eight bishops participated in parts or all of the two-week meeting, as well as many priests, religious and seminarians from several countries.

Juventutem groups have participated in each of the subsequent World Youth Day festivals: World Youth Day 2008 (Sydney, Australia), World Youth Day 2011 (Madrid, Spain), World Youth Day 2013 (Rio de Janeiro, Brazil), and World Youth Day 2016 (Kraków, Poland). Juventutem participated in World World Youth Day 2019 in Panama City, Panama where they held the first Solemn Pontifical Mass in the country since the reforms of the Second Vatican Council in 1965. Archbishop Alexander King Sample presided over this liturgy. In 2023 Juventutem also participated in the World Youth Day in Lisbon, Portugal. The movement celebrated its twentieth anniversary in 2024.

=== Fœderatio Internationalis Juventutem ===
An umbrella organization, the Fœderatio Internationalis Juventutem (F.I.J.) was founded on 24 May 2006. Early in its existence, the FIJ numbered more than fifteen nation-based groups, including ones in the United States, UK, Ireland, Australia, France, Chile, Argentina, Colombia, Brazil, Lithuania, Scotland, England, The Netherlands, Spain, Poland, Kenya, Hong Kong, and Hungary.

Members of the international Juventutem federation focus on the daily sanctification of youth according to the traditions of the Catholic Church. Attending World Youth Days is one of the possible means provided in order to reach that goal. As a consequence, those who are unable to attend World Youth Days (for various reasons) can join or start a local group within the international Juventutem federation – one such group is Young Catholic Adults (YCA), which was established in 2004 in the UK.
