= World Youth Day 1991 =

International Catholic youth event

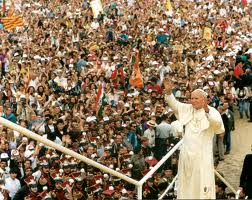
- Date: 10 August 1991 – 15 August 1991
- Location: Częstochowa, Poland
- Type: Youth festival
- Theme: You have received a spirit of children (Rom 8:15)
- Organised by: Catholic Church
- Participants: Pope John Paul II
- Previous: 1989 Santiago de Compostela
- Next: 1993 Denver
- Website: Vatican

The 1991 World Youth Day (Polish: Światowe Dni Młodzieży 1991) was held on 10–15 August 1991 in Jasna Góra in Częstochowa, Poland. The choice of another European city after Santiago de Compostela meant that, so far unique, two consecutive world days were held on the continent. It was celebrated in the Pope's native country. The theme can be summarized in the sentences You have received a spirit of sonship and It is for freedom that Christ has set us free. 1.6 million people gathered on the final Mass.

== Preparation ==
In the Message for the World Youth Day, announced on 15 August 1990 in the Vatican, John Paul II reminded the role of the Holy Spirit in Christian life. The Pope drew attention to the essence of true freedom and responsibility of Christians towards the world. He invited young people to come to the sanctuary of the Black Madonna at Jasna Góra. The choice of the Polish city of Częstochowa had a strong symbolic value: It is the site of a great sanctuary, to which even Pope John Paul II was very devoted, besides, the city was in Poland, where the Pope was born, so it was an opportunity to pay tribute to all those killed during the war and the Soviet regime.

== Theme ==
The theme chosen by Pope John Paul II from these days is the eighth chapter of the Epistle to the Romans, verse 15: "You have received a spirit of children."

== Hymn ==
The hymn of the World Day chosen for this year is called "Abba Ojcze", was composed of Sławomir Szychowiak, Mario Tomassi Tamoasso and Sergio Tomassi Tamoasso; and its anthem was composed by Jan Góra and Jacek Sykulski.

== Program ==
The event was held as part of the Pope's apostolic visit in Poland and Hungary celebrated 13 to 20, 1991. In particular, the WYD lasted five days, the first three with catechesis, as the vigil at the Mass in the Shrine of Jasna Góra for the pilgrims.

For the first time in the history of the world, the number of participants exceeded one million: precisely, according to various estimates, between 1,500,000 and 1,800,000. It beat the previous record of WYD Buenos Aires in 1987. These pilgrims came from 75 countries. For the first time, young people from the Warsaw Pact countries could participate.

Pope John Paul II used Esperanto to address young people present at Mount Hela at the opening and closing of WYD.

== See also ==
- Roman Catholicism in Poland
