= World Youth Day 1989 =

International Catholic youth event

- Date: 15 August 1989 – 20 August 1989
- Location: Santiago de Compostela, Spain
- Type: Youth festival
- Theme: ""I am the way, the truth and the life"." (Jn 14,6)
- Organised by: Catholic Church
- Participants: Pope John Paul II
- Previous: 1987 Buenos Aires
- Next: 1991 Częstochowa

World Youth Day 1989 (Spanish: Jornada Mundial de la Juventud 1989; Galician: Xornada Mundial da Xuventude 1989) was an event organized by the Catholic Church and took place on 15–20 August 1989 in Santiago de Compostela, Spain. It was the first European edition of this bi-tri-ennal event, excluding the two "zero editions" held in Rome in 1984 and 1985, and the first time the meeting did not take place on Palm Sunday, but in the middle of summer.

== Programming ==
=== Logo ===
The logo chosen for the WYD of Santiago consists of a blue circle surrounded by the words "I am the way, the truth and the life". The circle is crossed by a yellow stripe covered with shells that ends, at the top right, with a star. The latter is a reference to the legend concerning the discovery of the tomb of St. James; the yellow trail simultaneously represents the "tail" of the shooting star, both the streets of the Camino de Santiago, while the shells are the symbol of the pilgrim.

=== The anthem ===
The hymn composed for the Santiago WYD is titled "Somos los Jóvenes del 2000" ("We Are the Youth of 2000").

== Procedure ==
Many WYD participants reached the event venue by walking hundreds of kilometers along the Camino de Santiago - famous way of medieval pilgrimage to the sanctuary of Saint James.

For the first time in Santiago the catecheses were organized (which took place on August 19), on the themes "Christ is the Way", " Christ is the Truth", " Christ is the Life", inspired by the verse of the Gospel of John (John 14,6) chosen as the theme for that edition. Among those responsible for catechesis, Chiara Lubich (founder of the Focolare Movement), Carlo Maria Martini (then Archbishop of Milan), Massimo Camisasca and Antonio Lanfranchi.

The closing vigil, with the presence of Pope John Paul II, was held at the Monte do Gozo - hill located about five kilometers from the city center. In that place was later raised a monument in memory of both the papal visit and the arrival in the city of St. Francis of Assisi, which took place in the thirteenth century.

There were a public of 600,000 persons.
