= Night fever =

Night fever may refer to:

- Nightfever, a night of prayer and part of the Nightfever initiative which is rooted in the Catholic Church
- "Night Fever", a song by the Bee Gees
- Night Fever (TV series), a karaoke style show airing in the United Kingdom on Channel 5 (1997–2002)
- "Night Fever" (My Hero), a 2005 television episode

== See also ==
- Saturday Night Fever, 1977 American musical drama film directed by John Badham and starring John Travolta.
- Saturday Night Fever (book), by Nan Knighton
- Saturday Night Fever (musical), a musical with a book by Nan Knighton (in collaboration with Arlene Phillips, Paul Nicholas, and Robert Stigwood) and music and lyrics by the Bee Gees
