= Monte do Gozo =

Hill near Santiago de Compostela, Spain

Coordinates: 42°53′22″N 8°29′38″W

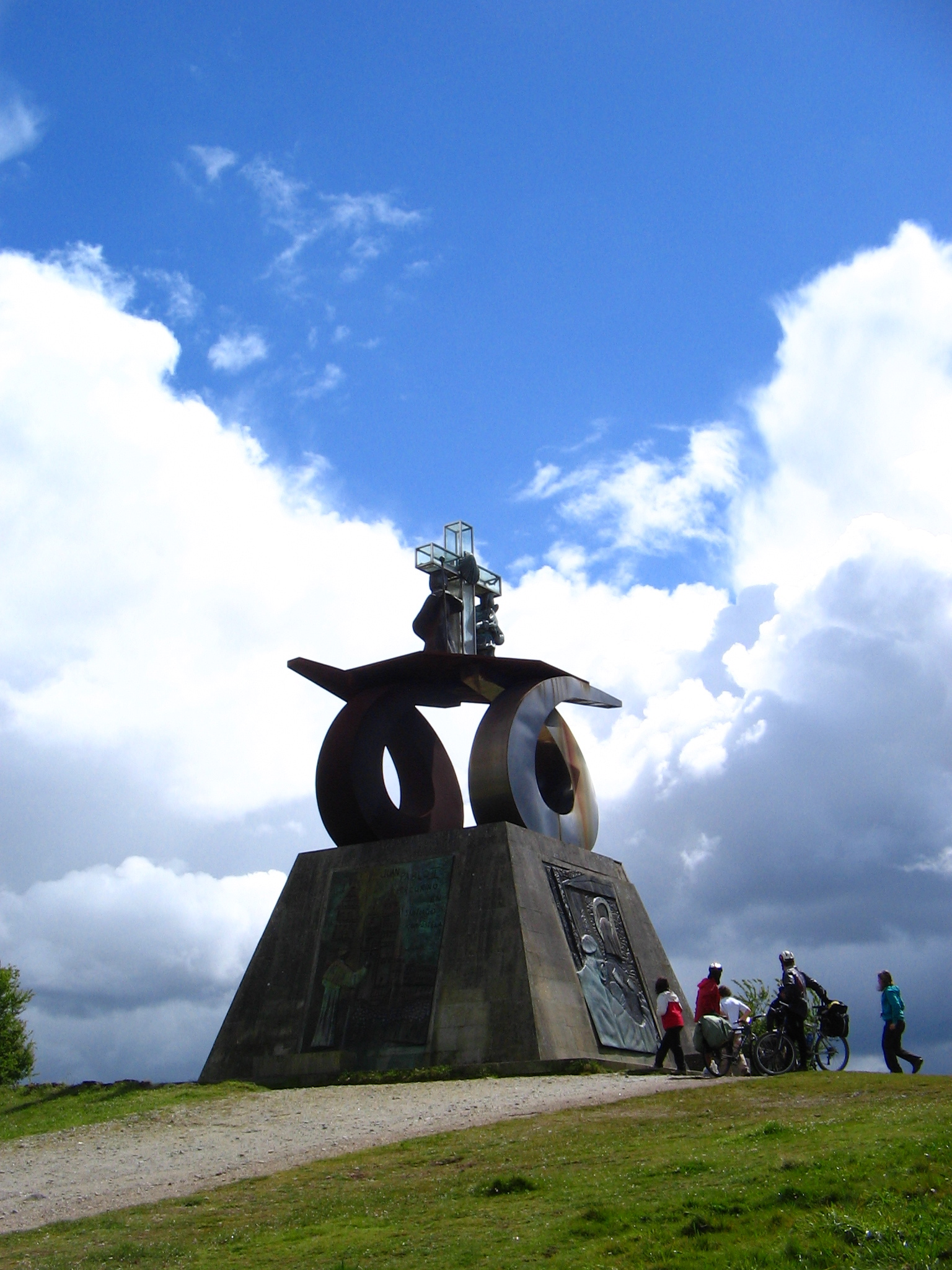
A modern religious sculpture adorns the top of Monte do Gozo

Monte do Gozo (Hill of Joy) is a hill in Santiago de Compostela, Galicia, Spain. It is known for being the place where Christian pilgrims on the Camino de Santiago (Way of St. James) can get their first views of the three spires of their destination, the Cathedral of Santiago de Compostela. At 370 metres (1,210 ft), it could be the pilgrims' last hill and optional last stop before reaching the cathedral, with between one and two hours' walk still to go, and by tradition is where they cried out in rapture at finally seeing the end of their path.

Monte do Gozo is about 4,5 kilometers (three miles) outside city centre, and is sometimes reachable by a 20-minute local bus ride in alternative to walking. It is less than a kilometer after the small hamlet of San Marcos. It rises 70 metres (230 ft) above the trail before it and 110 metres (360 ft) above the city. It is also a popular site for bicyclists.

The hill features the large (privatized, commercial) Ciudad de Vacaciones Monte do Gozo (Monte do Gozo Holiday City) development, constructed in 1993 for benefit of the pilgrims, which includes a spread-out, bungalow-style, 500-bed hotel/hostel, a camping ground, the large Auditorio Monte do Gozo for outdoor concerts (which has featured major international popular music artists), and gardens and walking paths, all on 65 hectares (160 acres). It was initially built in 1993 for use by pilgrims and resulted in a reshaping of the hill. Sponsored by the local government in conjunction with that year's local Holy Year for St. James' Day, some aspects of the development (especially the concert venue) drew the ire of the Church, which preferred a greater focus on the religious meaning of the area. While the hotel/hostel has helped relieve the city proper of accommodation pressure during peak times, its appearance itself has not always been viewed favourably, with one book calling it a "modern grief" and another characterizing it as "soul-crushingly awful".

The (actual) Camino is paved asphalt (alongside that optional park walk). The hill is surrounded by eucalyptus trees, which along with suburban structures have largely obscured the potential view of the cathedral from Monte do Gozo in recent times. Camino guide writer John Brierley cautions pilgrims not to expect too much from this stop (if made) and says that, "The tiny chapel of San Marcos is the only thing left on the hill that gives any sense of history to this romantic sounding place." Pope John Paul II visited the hill to lead the final mass in August 1989 of that year's World Youth Day. Sculptures reside atop it; the most dominant one (pictured) was placed to celebrate that event, and portrays on its base both John Paul's visit and a pilgrimage of Saint Francis of Assisi in the early 13th century.
