= World Youth Day 1993 =

International Catholic youth event

- Date: August 10, 1993 – August 15, 1993
- Location: Denver, Colorado, United States; 39°45′43″N 104°52′52″W
- Type: Youth festival
- Theme: I came that they might have life, and have it to the full. (Jn 10:10)
- Participants: Pope John Paul II
- Previous: 1991 Częstochowa
- Next: 1995 Manila
- Website: Vatican

The 1993 World Youth Day was held on August 10–15, 1993 in Denver, Colorado. It was the first World Youth Day held in either North America or an English-speaking nation.

The World Youth Day is an event for young people organized by the Roman Catholic Church. It is celebrated every two to three years at different locations.

== Theme ==
The theme chosen by Pope John Paul II for these days is taken from the tenth chapter of the Gospel of John (Jn 10:10): I came that they might have life, and have it to the full.

== Events ==
The event took place in the context of the pope's sixtieth apostolic journey, on which, before reaching Denver, he had stopped in Jamaica and Mexico. The journey lasted from August 9–16, 1993.

The program included a Stations of the Cross among the host city's skyscrapers; the vigil and final Mass took place inside Cherry Creek State Park, near the city of Aurora, about 15 miles (24 km) from downtown Denver. Between half a million and one million young people from one hundred nations participated in the various events that took place during the five calendar days of the event.

== Controversy ==
The event was criticized on the Catholic Television station EWTN. In a 1993 episode of Mother Angelica Live, Mother Angelica harshly criticized a mimed re-enactment of the Stations of the Cross which was not attended by Pope John Paul II. Mother Angelica was particularly upset that a woman was playing Jesus. Archbishop Rembert Weakland of the Archdiocese of Milwaukee called Mother Angelica's comments "one of the most disgraceful, un-Christian, offensive, and divisive diatribes I have ever heard." Mother Angelica responded by saying, "He didn't think a woman playing Jesus was offensive? He can go put his head in the back toilet as far as I am concerned!"
