= World Youth Day 2011 =

International Catholic youth event

XXVI World Youth Day
- Date: 16 August 2011– 21 August 2011
- Location: Madrid, Spain
- Type: Youth festival
- Theme: Rooted and built up in Jesus Christ, firm in the Faith" (cf. Colossians 2:7)
- Organised by: Catholic Church
- Participants: Pope Benedict XVI
- Previous: 2008 Sydney
- Next: 2013 Rio de Janeiro

World Youth Day 2011 (Spanish: Jornada Mundial de la Juventud 2011) was the 2011 occurrence of World Youth Day, a Catholic event held from 16–21 August 2011 in Madrid, Spain focused on youth. Media estimated the event's attendance as over a million or 1.5 million.

Pope Benedict XVI revealed the location of the event at the final Mass in Australia at Sydney's Royal Randwick Racecourse during World Youth Day 2008.

It was the second time that Spain hosted the event. World Youth Day 1989 was held from 15–20 August 1989 at Santiago de Compostela.

Spanish bishops, including Madrid's Metropolitan Archbishop, Cardinal Antonio Maria Rouco Varela, and the coordinator of the World Youth Day 2011, Madrid Auxiliary Bishop César Franco Martínez, urged Pope Benedict XVI to name patrons for the event. Saint Rafael Arnáiz Barón, Saint Francis Xavier, Saint Isidore the Laborer, Saint Maria Torribia, Saint Teresa of Avila, Saint Ignatius of Loyola, Saint John of Avila, Saint Rose of Lima, Saint John of the Cross, and Blessed John Paul II were all designated as co-patrons of World Youth Day 2011.

This was Pope Benedict XVI's last World Youth day.

== Economics ==
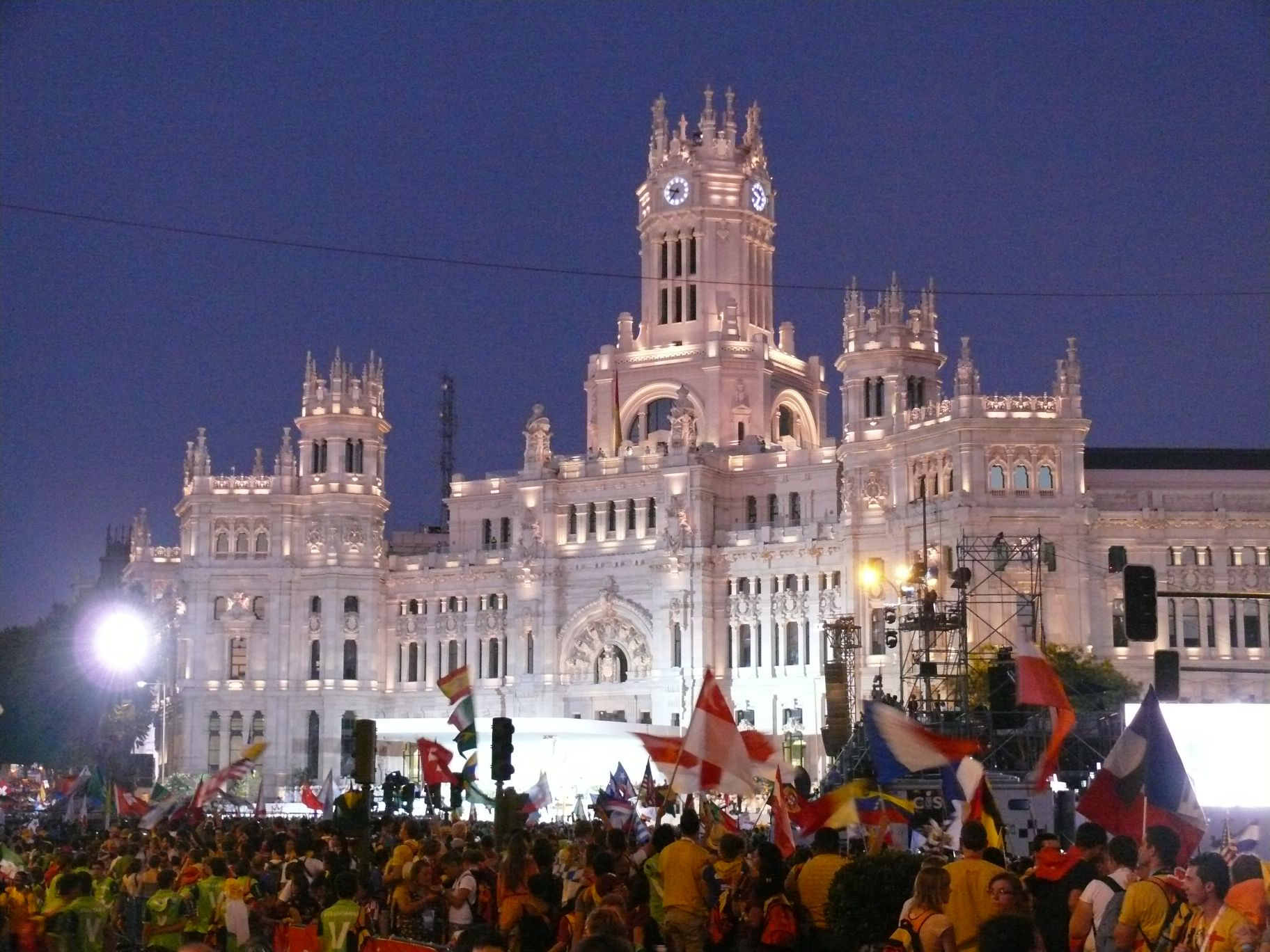
Mass in front of Madrid's townshall during the World Youth Day

The event is self-financed by contributions from pilgrims (70%) along with companies and individuals (30%). The state's estimated cost for security and infrastructure is €50 million, while officials estimated that the event would generate as much as €150 million in tourist revenue. Three months after the World Youth Day, the accountancy firm PriceWaterhouseCoopers released a report estimating that the economic impact of this event was about 354 million Euros in Spain.

== Theme ==
The theme for 2011′s World Youth Day is "Rooted and Built Up in Jesus Christ, Firm in the Faith" (cf Col 2:7).

=== Official song ===
The official song for World Youth Day 2011 in Madrid was "Firmes en la fe" ("Firm in the faith"). The song, was composed by Father Enrique Castro, with lyrics by Auxiliary Bishop Cesar Franco of Madrid. The seven verses of the hymn refer to Christ's closeness to young people through his humanity. It was composed based on the WYD 2011 theme, "Planted and built up in Jesus Christ, firm in the faith," taken from St. Paul's letter to the Colossians.

== Organization ==
The Cuatro Vientos Airport provided the location for vigil and final mass.

== Schedule of events ==
- 8–15 August

Days in the Dioceses in more than 40 Spanish dioceses

- 16 August (Tuesday)

8.00am: Arrival at Madrid: From the early morning, the pilgrims and groups registered in WYD were able to collect their accreditation and backpacks in the places indicated by the organization.
8.00pm: Opening Mass: World Youth Day began with a Mass in Madrid´s Cibeles Square, presided over by the archbishop of Madrid and concelebrated by the bishops and priests participating
9.30pm onwards: Cultural programme

- 17 August (Wednesday)

10.00am: Catechesis sessions
9.00pm onwards: Cultural programme (among other events, the Emmanuel Community organised the Noche de Alegría in the Madrid Arena sports place)

- 18 August (Thursday)

10.00am: Catechesis sessions
12.00pm: The Pope arrived at the Barajas Airport
2.40pm: The Pope drove through the streets of the city in the Popemobile to reach the Nunciature.
7.30pm: Papal Welcome Ceremony with youth at Plaza de Cibeles
9.00pm onwards: Cultural programme

- 19 August (Friday)

10.00am: Catechesis sessions
11.30am: Papal Meeting at El Escorial young religious sisters and university professors
7.30pm: Via crucis along the Paseo de Recoletos
9.00pm onwards: Cultural programme

- 20 August (Saturday)

10.00am: Mass for seminarians in the Almudena Cathedral
4.00pm: Preparatory ceremony in Cuatro Vientos: Young people arrived at the Cuatro Vientos Airport and took their places. Meanwhile, different activities took place on the stage (testimonies of young people, musical interpretations, prayers to the Virgin, etc.), to prepare for the Vigil.
7.40pm: Pope visited the "Fundación Instituto San José", a center for the sick run by the es:Orden Hospitalaria de San Juan de Dios
8.30pm: Vigil with the Pope: The Pope arrived at Cuatro Vientos to celebrate an Eucharistic adoration.
11.00pm: Night in Cuatro Vientos: From early in the morning, pilgrims arrived at Cuatro Vientos, but were not able to adore the eucharist as planned because of the storm that damaged the chapels. The stage was designed by Ignacio Vicens, an architect who had assisted with World Youth Day celebrations during the time of John Paul II.

The number of people attending exceeded expectations, which means more land had to be found round the edges to accommodate the people. An estimated 1,000,000 were in the aerodrome at seven o'clock in the evening, which made this the largest Catholic event ever staged in Spain. Many pilgrims walked from the centre of Madrid (12.6 km), although extra public transport was put on.

The Pope arrived and a cross was carried in procession to the altar. Several young people were picked to ask questions to the Pope, but a sudden thunderstorm and high winds, meant that the Pope's address had to be communicated to the crowd in written form.

The Pope resumed the adoration of the Eucharist, after the rain, although with a shortened programme. A mass with distribution of the Eucharist to many in the crowd had to be reduced in dimension.

Many stayed during the night, and the Sunday morning mass took on a larger dimension to make up for the day before.

- 21 August (Sunday)

9.30am: Final Mass: The Pope concelebrated Mass with thousands of bishops and priests. At the end of the concluding Mass, the Pope announced the place where the next edition of World Youth Day would be held.
5.30pm: Encounter with Volunteers: Pope Benedict XVI had a brief meeting with the WYD volunteers at the es:IFEMA
6.30 pm: Papal Farewell ceremony at the Barajas Airport

== Protests ==
On 17 August a demonstration against public funding of the World Youth Day and for a Spanish secular state took place in Madrid. The protesters were confronted by riot police with truncheons. Eight people were arrested and eleven were injured.

Protests centred on the Pope and the number of protestors never reached beyond a few thousand. No WYD events were interrupted by their demonstrations. There were a few scuffles between pilgrims and the protestors.

== Next event ==
On 21 August 2011, at the closing Mass, the Pope revealed that the next event will be held in 2013 in Rio de Janeiro, Brazil. The location was leaked a few months before this however. World Youth Day 2013 was held 2 years later, due to Brazil's hosting of the 2014 FIFA World Cup and 2016 Summer Olympics.
