= World Youth Day 2002 =

International Catholic youth event

Coordinates: 43°44′15″N 79°28′42″W

XVII World Youth Day
- Date: July 23, 2002- July 28, 2002
- Location: Toronto, Ontario, Canada
- Type: Youth festival
- Theme: You are the salt of the earth ... you are the light of the world" (Matthew 5:13-14)
- Organised by: Catholic Church
- Participants: Pope John Paul II
- Song: "Lumière Du Monde, The Light of World"
- Previous: 2000 Rome
- Next: 2005 Cologne
- Website: Vatican

The 17th World Youth Day 2002 (French: Journées mondiales de la jeunesse 2002) was a Catholic youth festival held July 23 to 28, 2002, in Toronto, Ontario, Canada. World Youth Day is a celebration of faith begun by Pope John Paul II held on an international level every two to three years. Although World Youth Day is designed for Catholics, it attracts sizable numbers of youths from other faiths and denominations and was presented as a multi-faith celebration of young people from all over the world. As the event is ultimately an expression of faith, and a critical expression of faith is through service to others, World Youth Day 2002 had the support of some 25,000 volunteers; and some 100,000 pilgrims themselves spent three hours each on one of 750 service projects.

== Theme ==
The theme of the event was a fragment from Jesus' speech on the Mount of Beatitudes: "You are the salt of the earth ... you are the light of the world". (Matthew 5:13-14).

== Events ==
The World Youth Day began with a pre-program in numerous Canadian dioceses.

=== 18 to 21 July ===
From 18 to 21 July, for the first time the international guests were also invited to stay in 35 dioceses throughout Canada (mostly in Montreal and Quebec). In this way they experienced local culture; they also carried out social activities in the cities where they resided; they prayed with the young Canadians, and they organized parties and concerts.

=== 22 July ===
The young pilgrims arrived in Toronto on 22 July. They took up their accommodations. They had the first meetings with young people from the city.

=== 23 July ===
The official start in Toronto was the opening show on Tuesday, July 23 at 16:00 local time. Archbishop of Toronto, Cardinal Aloysius Ambrozic celebrated the opening mass at 5 pm in the Exhibition Place, a vast exhibition area near Lake Ontario. On this occasion, the Archbishop welcomed the young people of the other Canadian dioceses and of the various nations to the city. After the mass there was a concert where Canadian artists performed themselves.

=== 24 July ===
In the morning the catechesis began in more than 100 churches and halls of the city, led by bishops from all over the world. The theme of this day were:

"You are the salt of the earth" (Mt 5,13)

It started at 2 pm at Coronation Park, a pleasant wooded area on the banks of Ontario (renamed for the occasion Duc in Altum Park), a large space where it was possible to pray before the WYD Cross and confess thanks to a Service of Reconciliation made possible by a large presence of priests of different languages. An area of the park was also dedicated to Eucharistic adoration. In the afternoon the Youth Festival opened, where they found space for a varied panorama of artistic, cultural and spiritual experiences based on the life and faith of young people from all over the world; exhibitions, vigils, concerts, round tables, films, dances and theatrical events were organized at Exhibition Place. At the Molson Amphitheatre in Toronto, there was a meeting between Italians and Italian young people, many in Canada. Among the artists present were Antonella Ruggiero, Paolo Vallesi, Ceppe Cantarelli, Massimo Varini Trio, Lisa, Hope Music Group and Anna Tatangelo. For the first time some social assistance projects were included in the Youth Festival, to allow young pilgrims to spend a few hours of their time at the service of the most needy and forge new bonds of solidarity with the community that hosted them.

=== 25 July ===
The Pope arrived in Toronto on Thursday, July 25, and was welcomed with a welcome event at the Exhibition Park. Catecheses continued by following the theme: "You are the light of the world" (Mt 5:14). In the evening the Youth Festival continued. In the meantime the Duc reconciliation service continued in Altum Park.

=== 26 July ===
During the day the catecheses ended by following the theme: "Let yourselves be reconciled with God" (2Co 5,20). In the evening, the stations of the cross was held at University Avenue, one of Downtown Toronto's main arteries. The Way of the Cross, started by Nathan Philip Square (seat of the municipal building) came in procession to the Royal Ontario Museum passing also in front of the University, the main hospitals and the seat of the provincial parliament. Duc's reconciliation service continued in Altum Park. The Youth Festival ended in the evening.

- Friday: "Reconcile with God" (2 Cor 5,20)

=== 27 July ===
During the morning Mass for pilgrims took place in the churches of Toronto. Throughout the day the pilgrimage on foot (with a distance of 6 to 10 km) was held towards Downsview Park, the place of the vigil, a former military airport with its 260 hectares, the largest urban park in Canada. At 7.30 pm the vigil with the Pope began. The young people spent the night outdoors on site in adoration to the Blessed Sacrament.

=== 28 July ===
To the closing event consisted of the vigils, subsequent overnight stay and the closing fair, the approximately 260-acre Downsview Park was used. On the former military airfield, Pope John Paul II early in the morning celebrated the final Holy Mass. The number of participants reaches 800,000 persons.

As part of the final event, the Pope announced that the next International World Youth Day 2005 will take place in Cologne. In an appeal, he then turned to the German-speaking youth: "Dear young Germans! It is especially important for you to keep alive the spirit of World Youth Day in view of the meeting in Cologne in 2005. Join in a civilization of love and justice! Be yourself a shining example that leads many others to the kingdom of Christ, the kingdom of truth, justice and peace." Pope John Paul II

== Days in the Diocese ==
World Youth Day 2002 solidified Days of the Diocese, held in various dioceses, with the majority in Montreal, Quebec, and London, Ontario, as a major component leading up to the actual WYD Celebrations. Days of the Diocese involved the participation of 35 of Canada's 72 dioceses. Events in various communities welcomed pilgrims from all over the world with music, prayers, and cathechetical sessions. The week-long World Youth Day Celebrations involved the use of some 129 Catholic churches and 7 halls at Exhibition Place, 10 stages (as well as Downsview Park and 5 other parks in Toronto), 30 seminars, 10 prayer experiences, 300 vocational or service group exhibits, 10 cultural gatherings.

== John Paul II's last WYD ==
With deteriorating health, there was speculation that the Pope would not be able to attend the celebrations. His address thanked the local, provincial, and federal levels of the Canadian government for supporting the idea of hosting WYD, and recalled his previous Apostolic Journeys to the country and acknowledged that he does not have the same physical strength he once had. Pope John Paul II participated by being present at all the major events of the week. While not being able to participate in person, he did view the Friday Stations of the Cross via television coverage by the CBC. He led the Saturday evening vigil and presided over the Holy Mass on the Sunday, delivering a homily which focused on entrusting the future of the church to the youth.

== Theme song ==
The theme song, "Light of the World" was composed by Fr Robert Lebel, a Quebec priest and a well-known composer of French-language religious music; and translated into English by Bishop Paul-André Durocher. Four official versions were released as follows:

- "Lumière du monde" (International) - with an English/French chorus, and four verses in French, English, Spanish and Italian, respectively.
- "Light of the World" (English)
- "Lumière du monde" (French)
- "Lumière du monde" (Instrumental)

The songs were released on a two disc official CD set entitled "Lumière du Monde/Light of the World", released by Oregon Catholic Press (OCP). The album featured bands such as Critical Mass, Susan HooKong Taylor, Janelle, and Jesse Manibusan, among others.

Other versions were also released in localised languages which include the following Chinese versions released by Photon Distribution, Inc. on the disc entitled The Way 4 - Light of the World:

- "Light of the World" (粤話版) - with Cantonese verses and an English/Cantonese chorus translated by the "World Youth Day 2002 Theme Song Cantonese Translation Team" and sung by Tony Leung and Agnes Tao.
- "Light of the World" (國話版) - with Mandarin translations by Kevin Cheung; sung by Ricky Cheung and Martina Lee.
- "Light of the World" (Chinese Instrumental) - arranged by James Ng with Chinese instruments

== Attendance ==
A crowd of over 800,000 to 850,000 youths from all over the world was in attendance for these events, a presence below expectations, mainly due to the international conflict that had shaken America and especially the United States after the attack of September 11, 2001. One of the results of the WYD on Canadian soil was the creation of Salt + Light Television, a bilingual Catholic television network broadcast throughout the country that produces several original programs in both English and French. Father Thomas Rosica, who was the national director of the World Youth Day 2002, is also the founder and executive officer of this television channel.

== Patron saints and blesseds of this event ==
- Agnes of Rome
- Pedro Calungsod
- Josephine Bakhita
- Thérèse of Lisieux
- Kateri Tekakwitha
- Andrew of Phú Yên
- Pier Giorgio Frassati
- Marcel Callo
- Francisco Castelló Aleu

== See also ==
- World Youth Day

== Additional notes ==
- 850,000 people would place the number of people at Downsview Park on 28 July 2002 the 4th largest city in Canada according to the List of the largest municipalities in Canada by population
