= World Youth Day 2005 =

International Catholic youth event

Coordinates: 50°53′15″N 6°44′40″E

XX World Youth Day 2005
- Date: 16 August 2005 – 21 August 2005
- Location: Cologne, Germany
- Type: Youth festival
- Theme: We have come to worship Him (Matthew 2:2)
- Organised by: Catholic Church
- Participants: Pope Benedict XVI
- Song: Venimus adorare eum
- Previous: 2002 Toronto
- Next: 2008 Sydney

XX World Youth Day (German: XX. Weltjugendtag) was a Catholic youth festival that started on 16 August and continued until 21 August 2005 in Cologne, Germany, commemorating the 20th anniversary of the first World Youth Day held in 1985. It was the first World Youth Day and foreign trip of Pope Benedict XVI, who joined the festival on 18 August. This meeting was decided by the previous pope, John Paul II, during the Toronto World Youth Day of 2002. The theme was "We have come to worship Him" (from Matthew 2:2).

About 400,000 young people from 200 countries attended during the week, and more than 1,000,000 came for the weekend. They were joined by about 600 bishops and cardinals, as well as by 6,600 reporters.

== The Pope's Apostolic Journey to Germany ==
Do not be deterred from taking part in Sunday Mass, and help others to discover it too. This is because the Eucharist releases the joy that we need so much, and we must learn to grasp it ever more deeply, we must learn to love it.

— Pope Benedict XVI

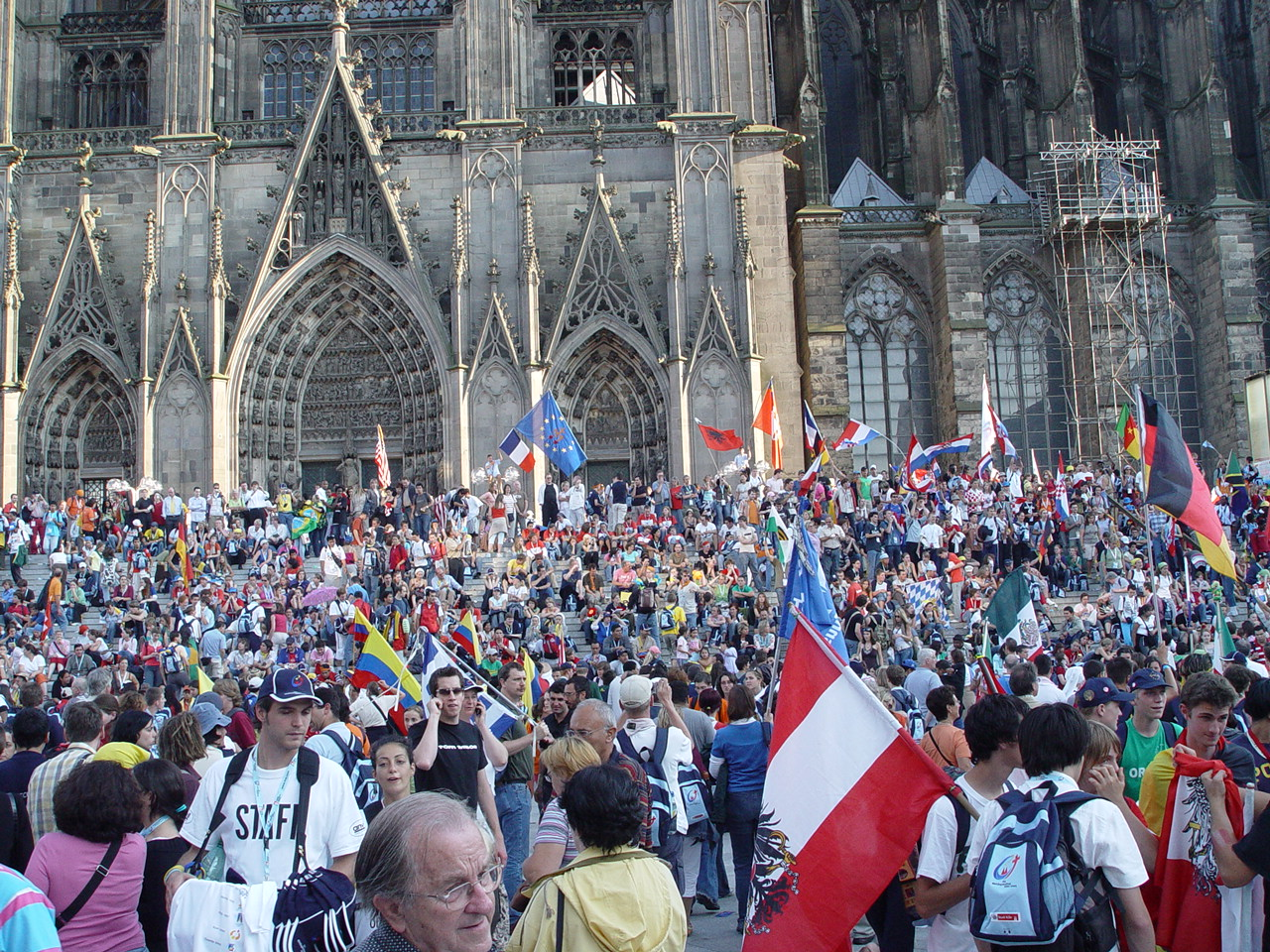
Pilgrims in front of Cologne Cathedral

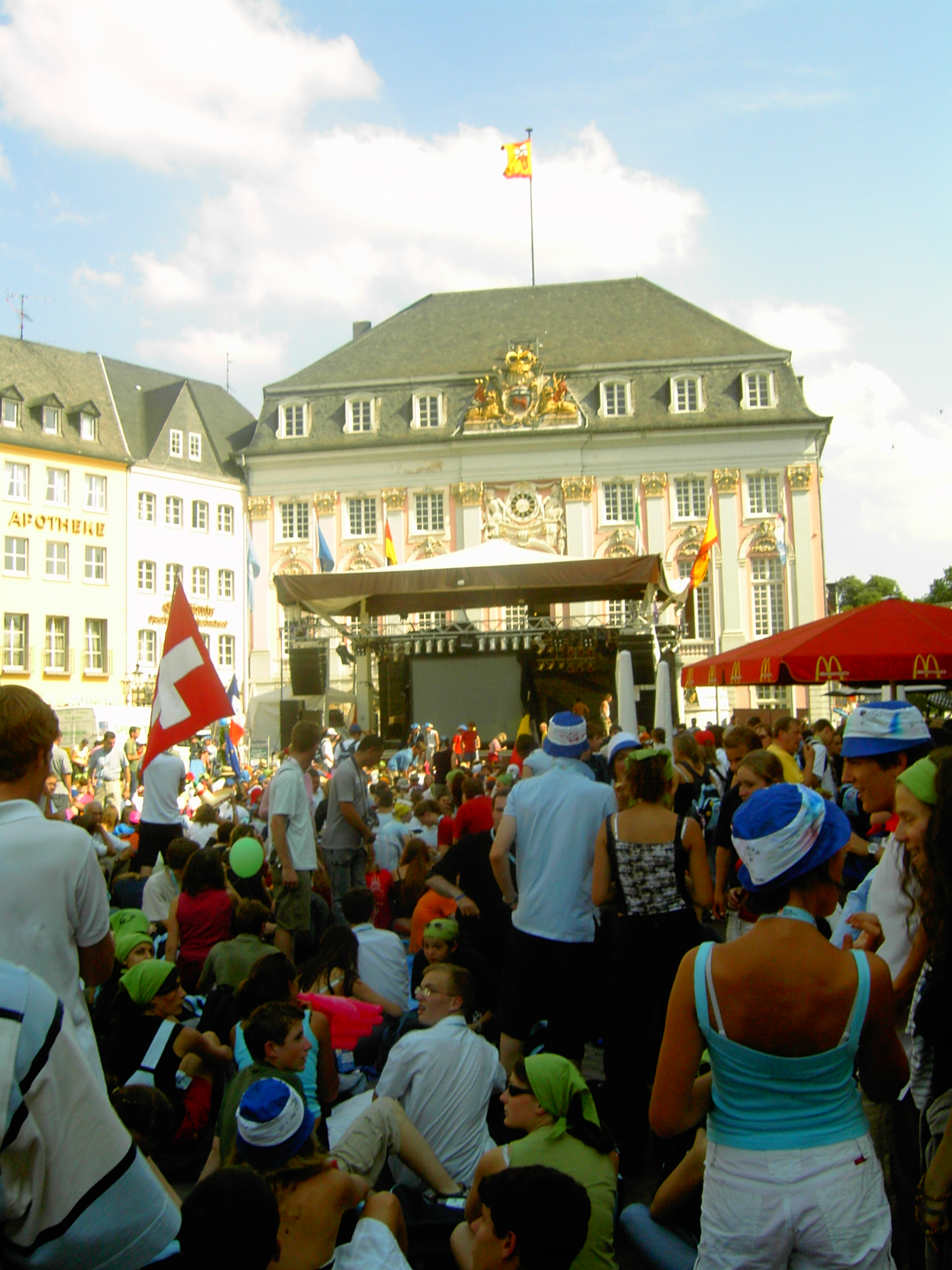
Pilgrims in Bonn

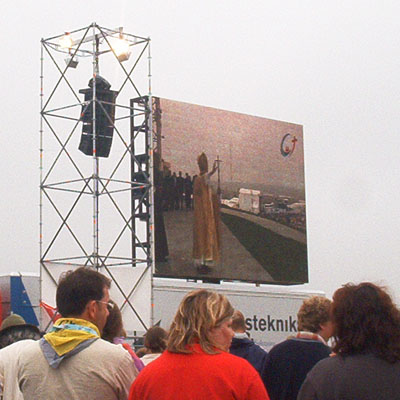
Pilgrims watching Pope Benedict XVI celebrating Mass on big screens

Originally, Pope John Paul II was to attend the World Youth Day in Cologne. As he died four months earlier, it was instead his successor Pope Benedict XVI's first apostolic journey. Pope Benedict XVI is a native of Germany. Most pilgrims to the World Youth Day made their plans to come while John Paul II was still Pope, and had hoped to see him. Before Pope Benedict XVI led the central mass, he met with several politicians and others.

=== 18 August ===
- 12:00 The Pope arrived at Köln-Bonn Airport
- 16:45–18:00 Journey on the Rhine, the Pope spoke in Köln-Poll
- 18:15 The Pope visited Cologne Cathedral

=== 19 August ===
- 10:30 The Pope met with German President Horst Köhler at Villa Hammerschmidt in Bonn
- 12:00 The Pope visited Roonstrasse Synagogue in Cologne. The synagogue was destroyed by the Nazis in 1938 and was rebuilt in the 1950s.
- 5:00 The Pope met with and prayed vespers with seminarians from over 80 nations at St. Pantaleon.

=== 20 August ===
- 10.00 The Pope met with Chancellor Gerhard Schröder, Wolfgang Thierse (president of the Bundestag), Angela Merkel (CDU chairwoman and leader of the opposition) and Jürgen Rüttgers (minister-president of North Rhine-Westphalia).

The Pope issued a plenary indulgence for those attending World Youth Day, with a partial indulgence available to all who pray fervently, with a contrite heart, that Christian youth

- be strengthened in the profession of the Faith;
- be confirmed in love and reverence towards their parents; and
- form a firm resolution to follow "the holy norms of the Gospel and Mother Church" in living out their present or future family life, or whatever vocation they are called to by God.

=== 21 August ===
- An estimated 1,000,000 people, after camping outdoors all night, joined Pope Benedict XVI for the concluding Mass in the vast Marienfeld near the village of Kerpen. Participants too far away to see the pope in the vast field watched the services on more than 15 large television screens. The Pope announced at the end of the mass that the next World Youth Day would take place in Sydney, Australia.

== Attending groups ==
Numerous interest groups attended World Youth Day: schools, universities, church groups, and new movements were all well represented by their attendance.

== Photographic gallery ==
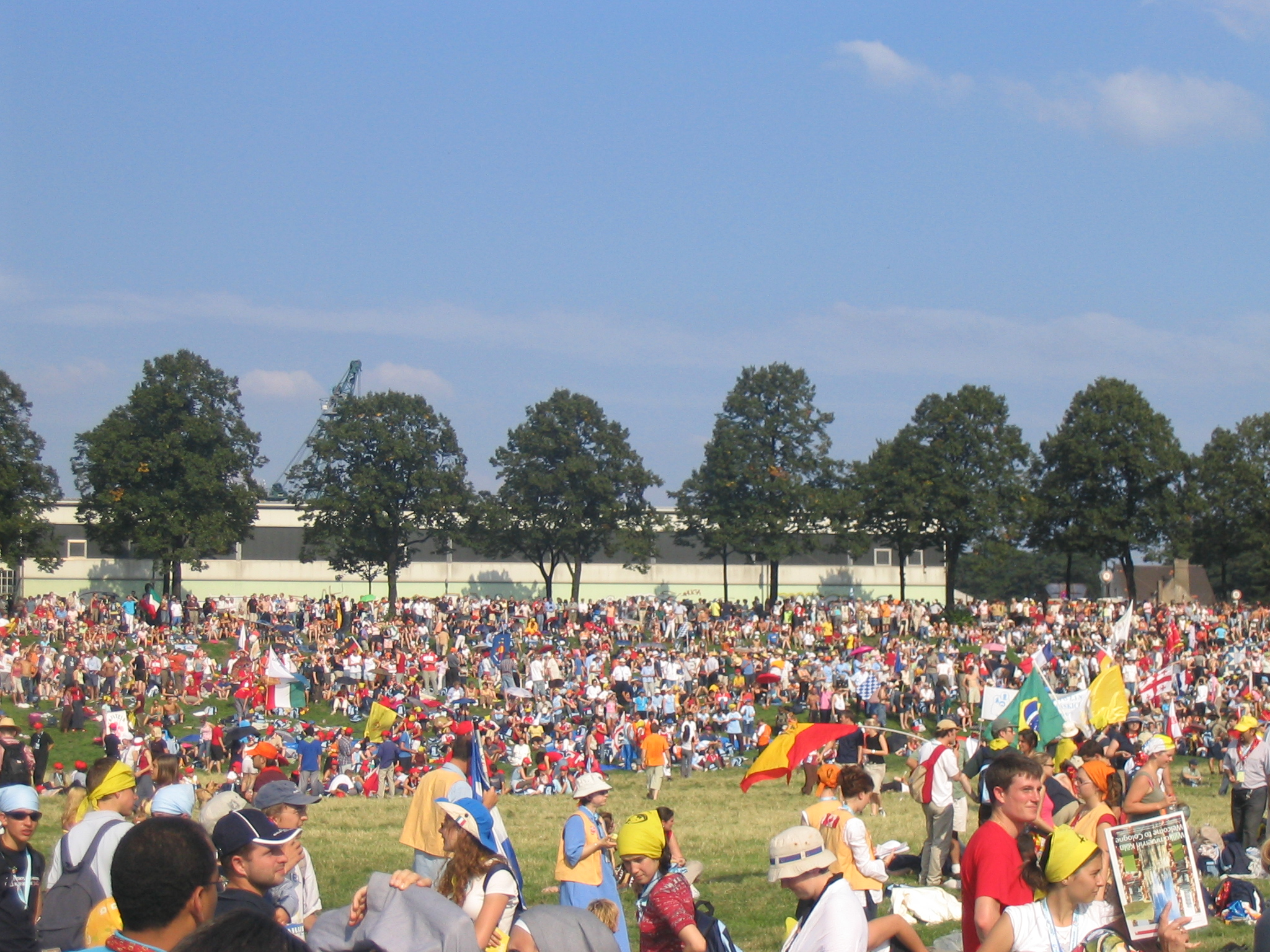
Pilgrims waiting for the Pope in the Rhin

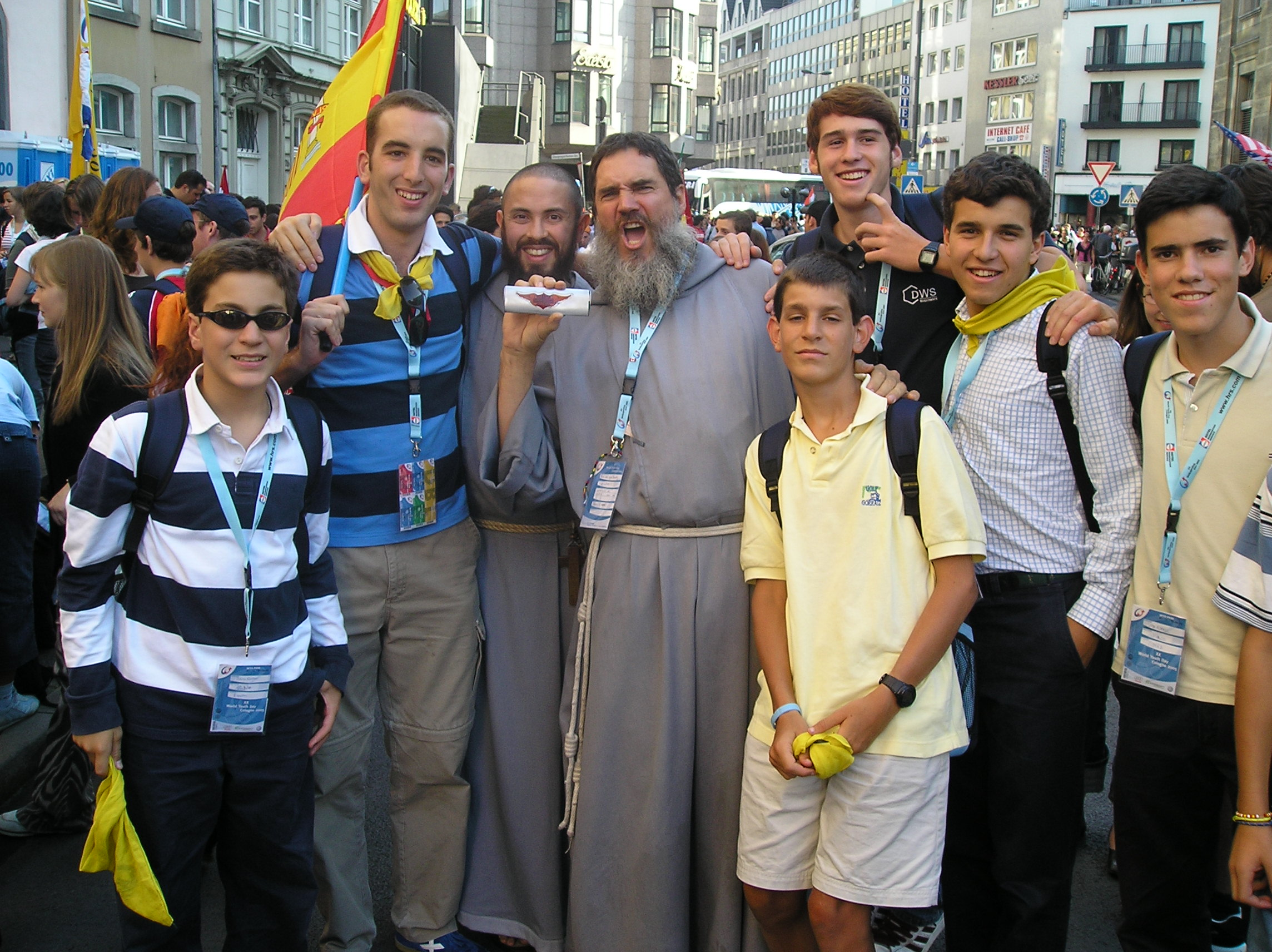
Group of pilgrims

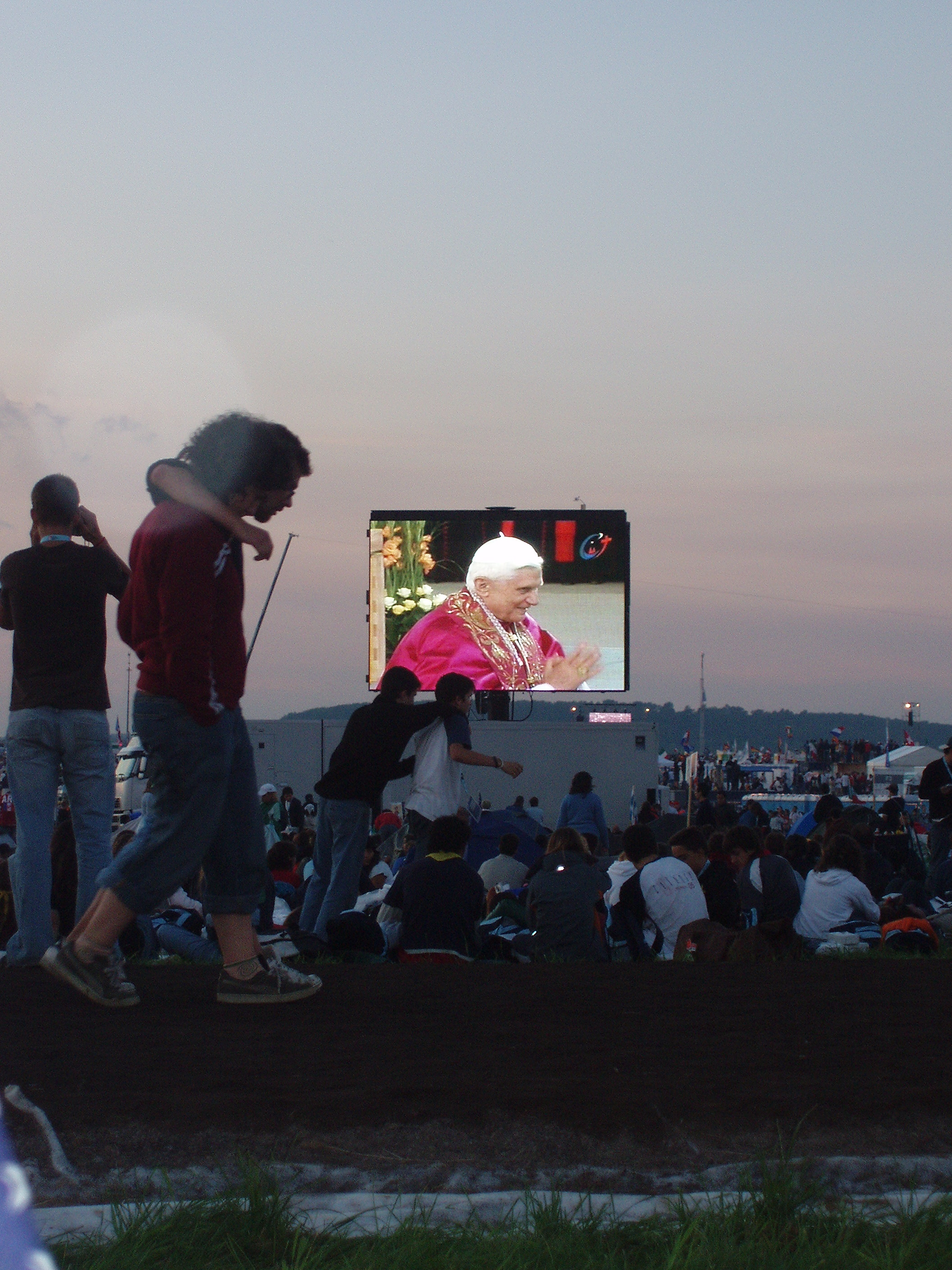
Meeting with the Pope

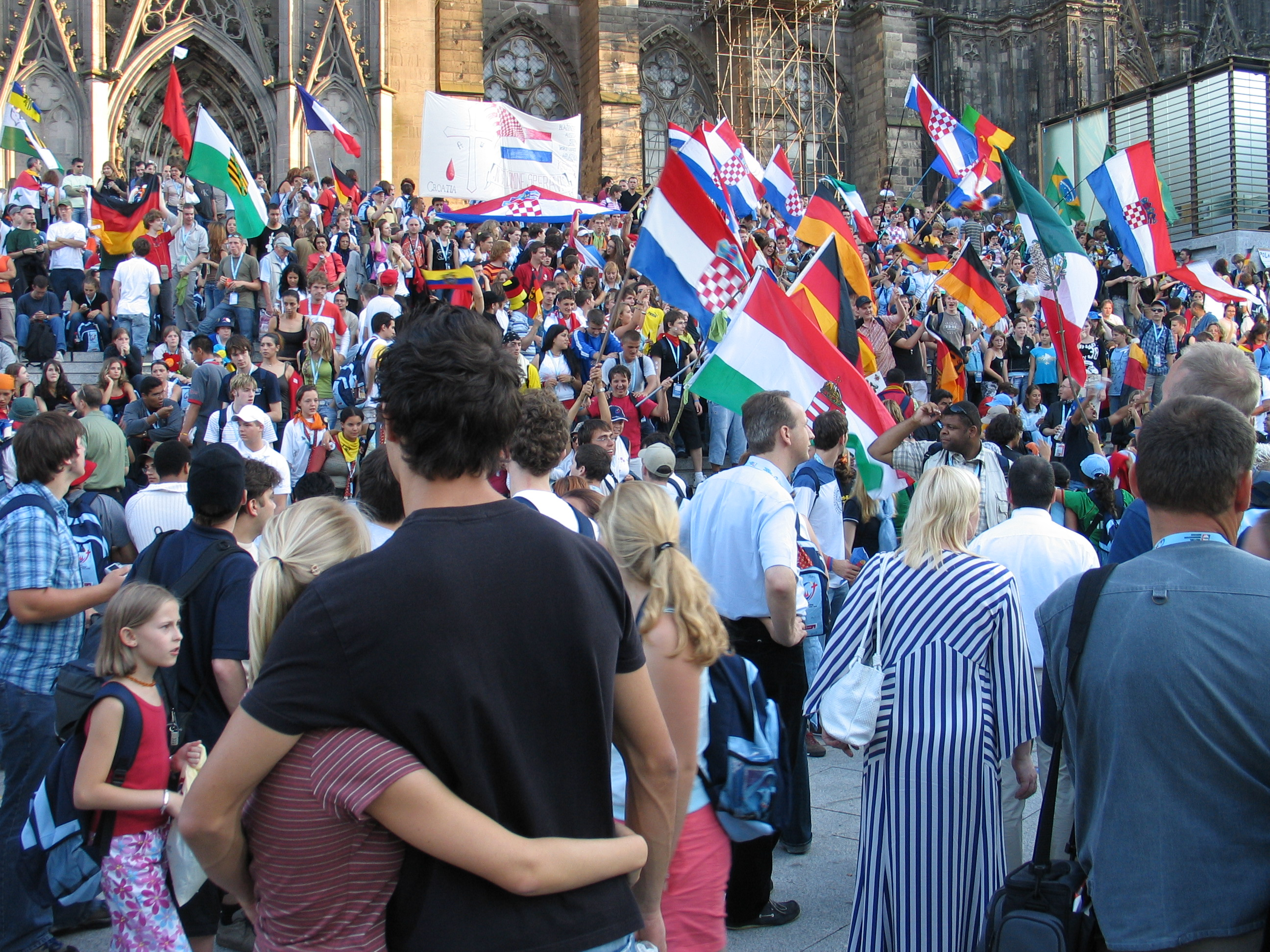
Pilgrims at the doors of the Cologne Cathedral

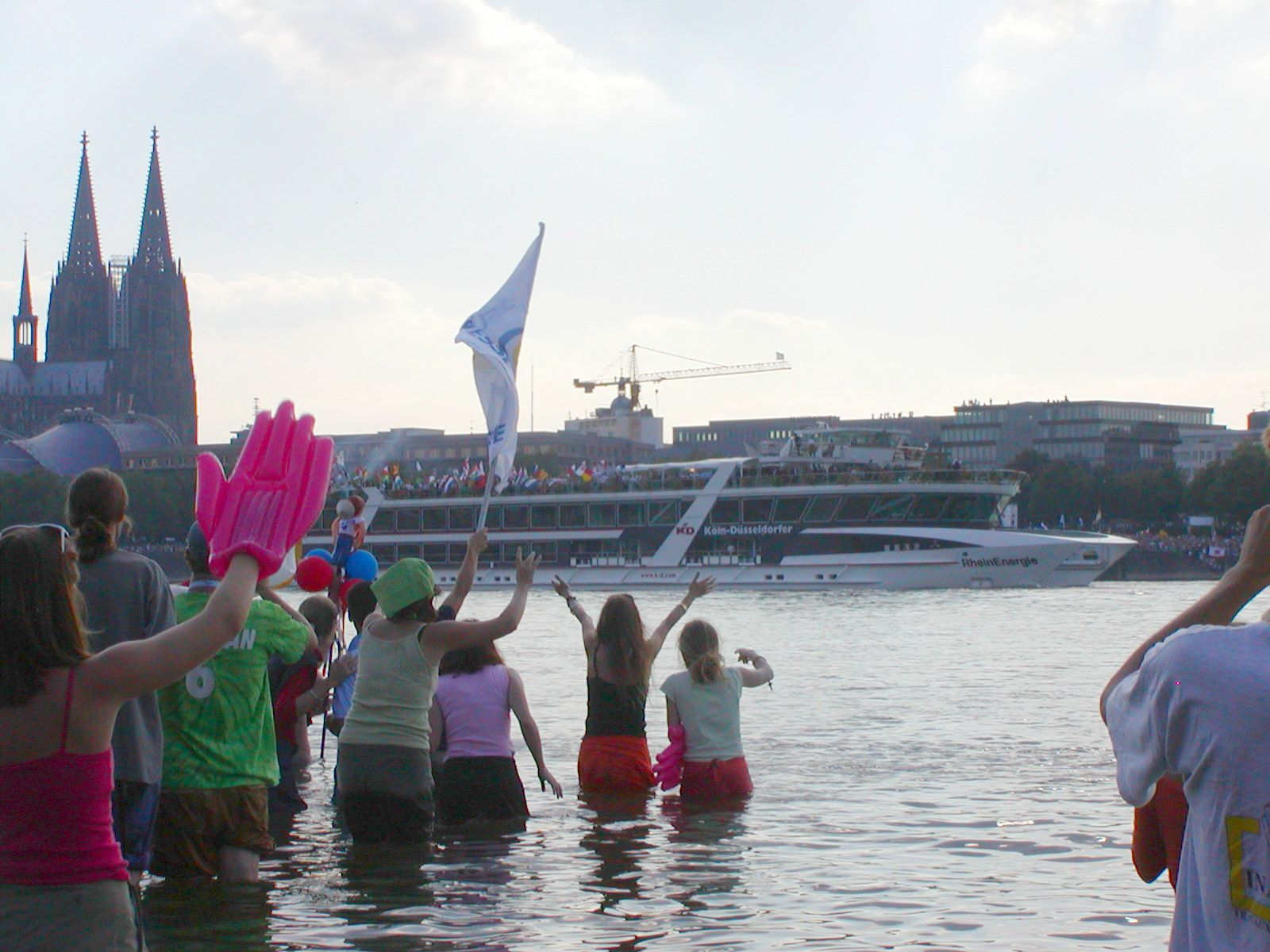
Arrival of the Pope to Cologne crossing the Rhin

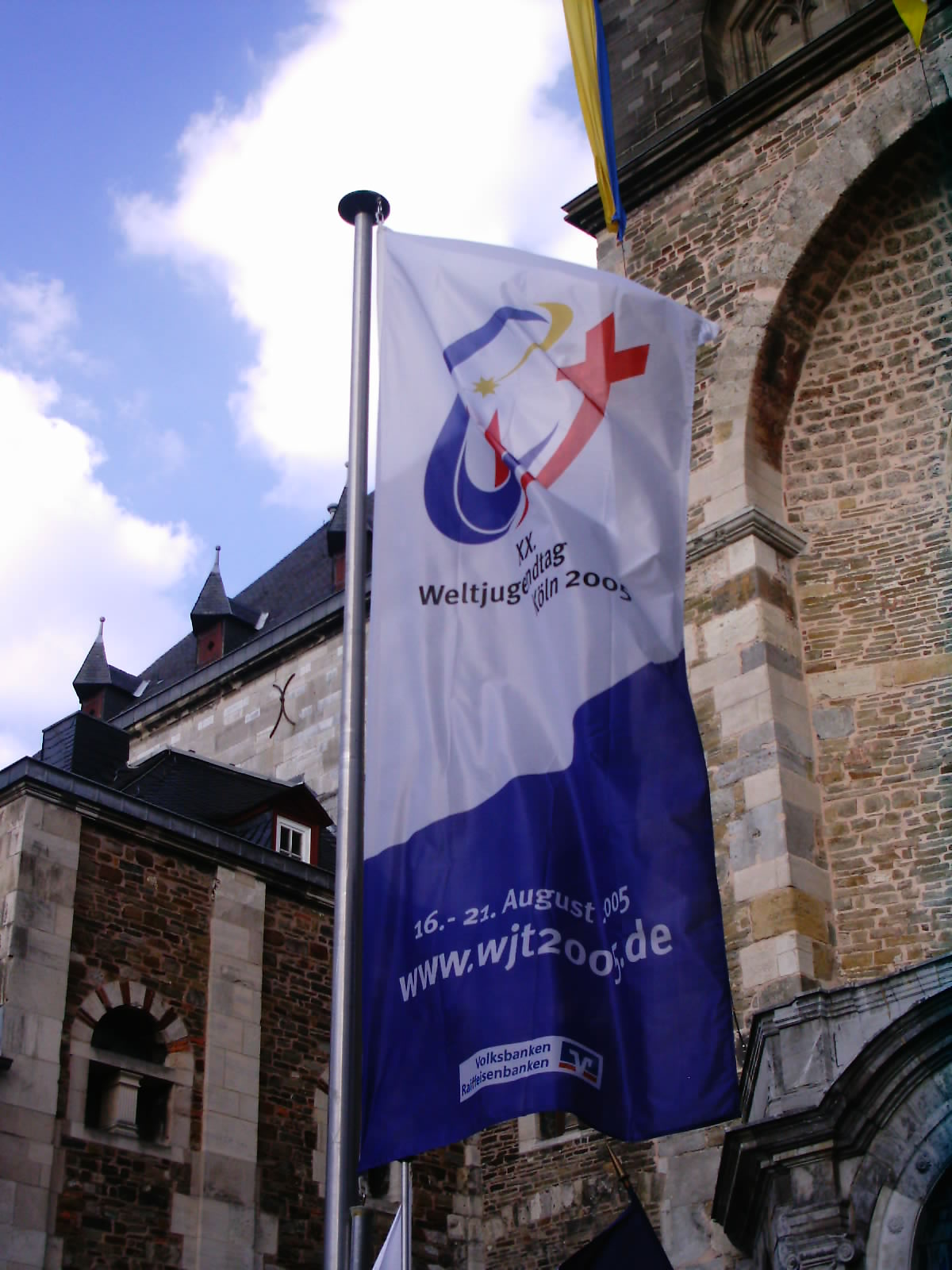
Flag with the logo of the WYD 2005

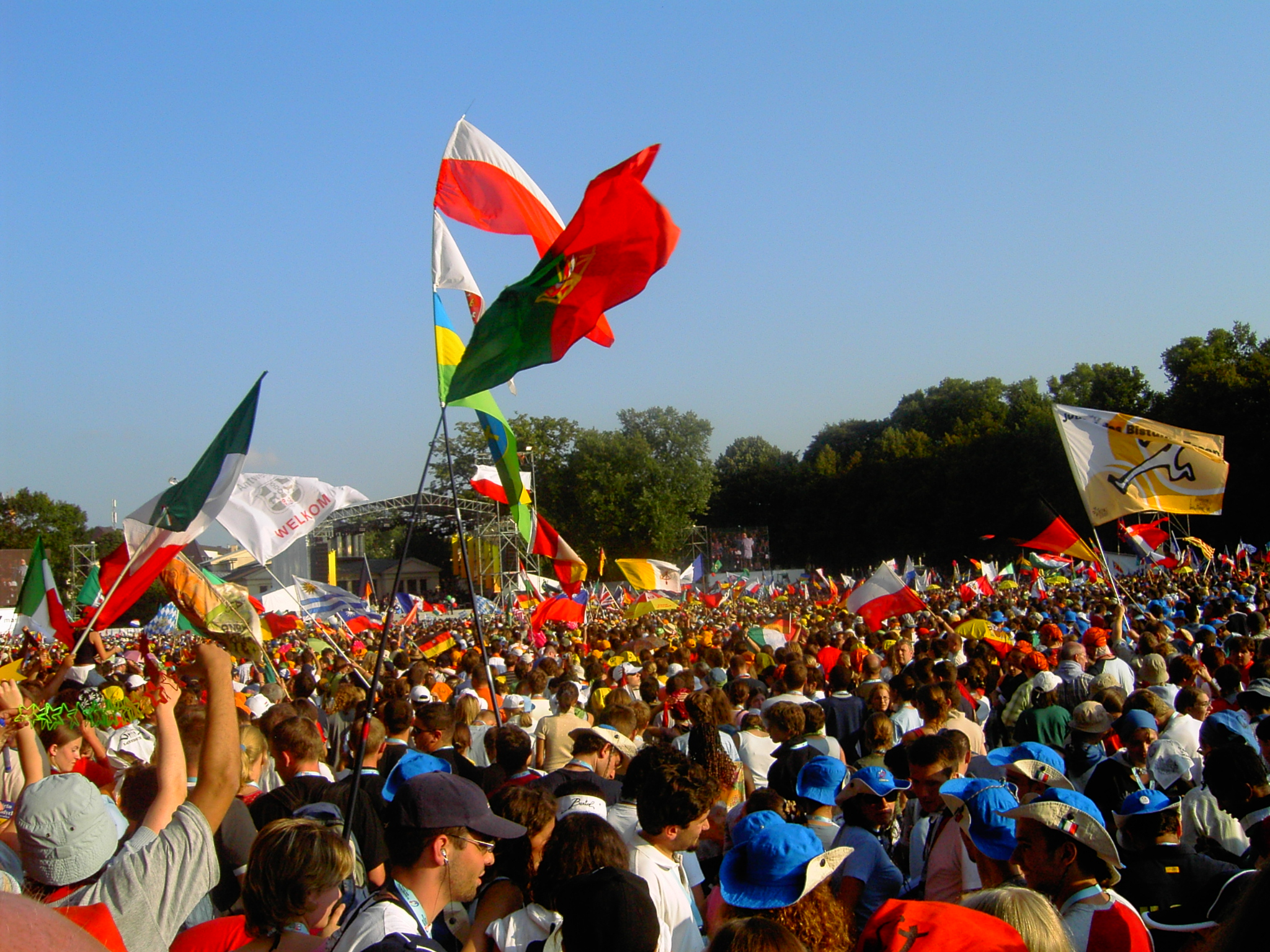
Opening celebration in Bonn

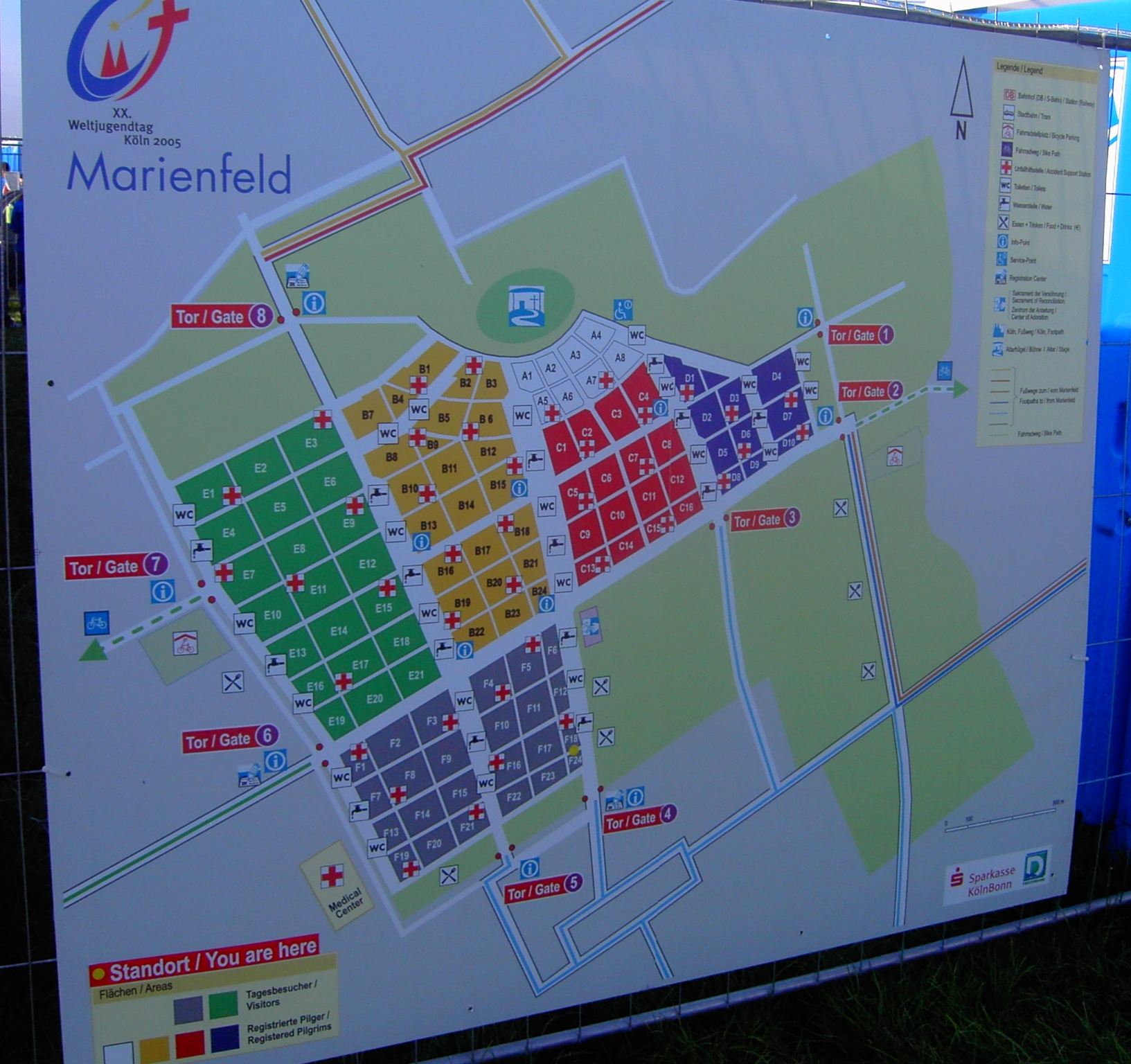
Map of Marienfeld

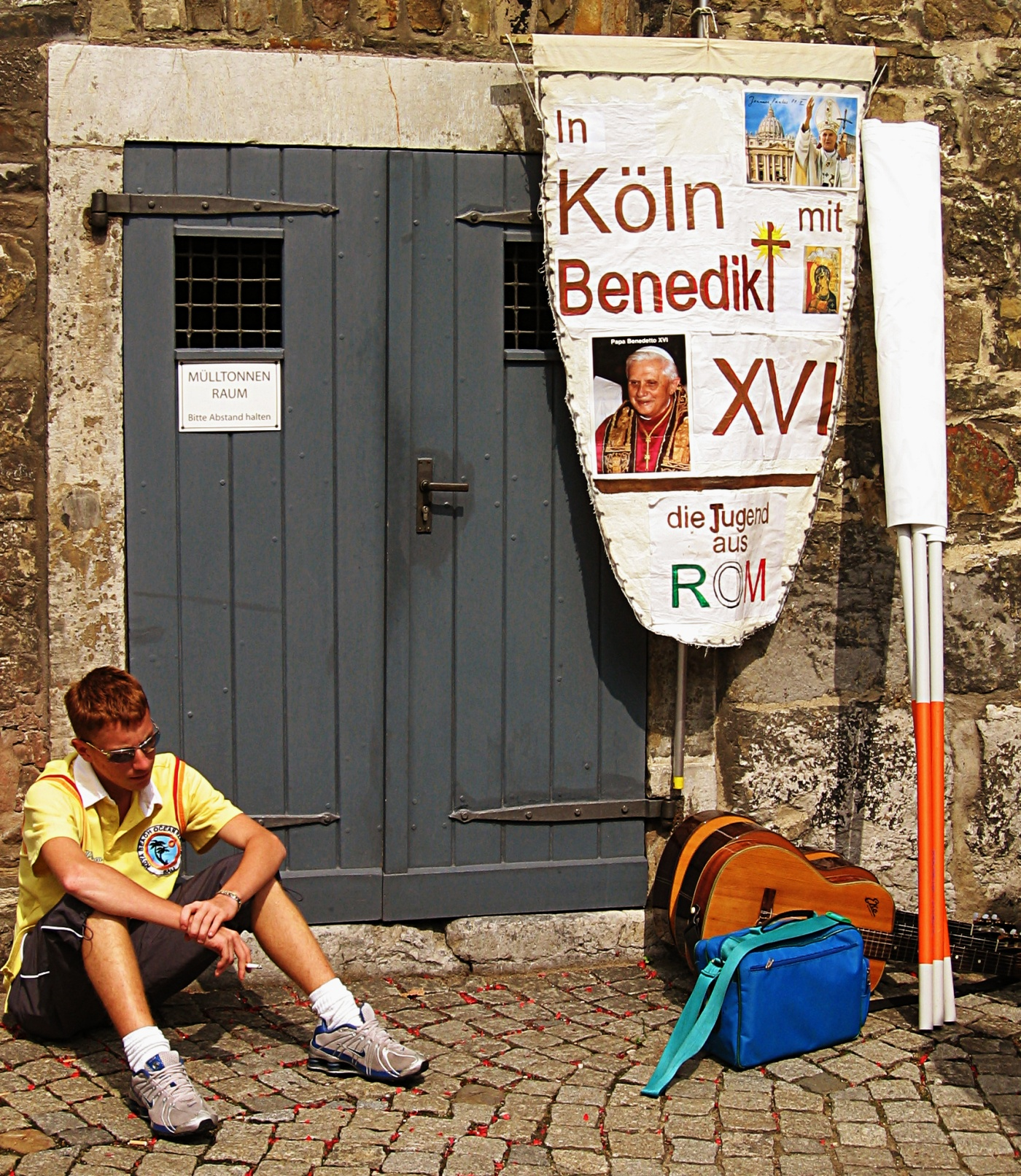
Reveller at Aachen

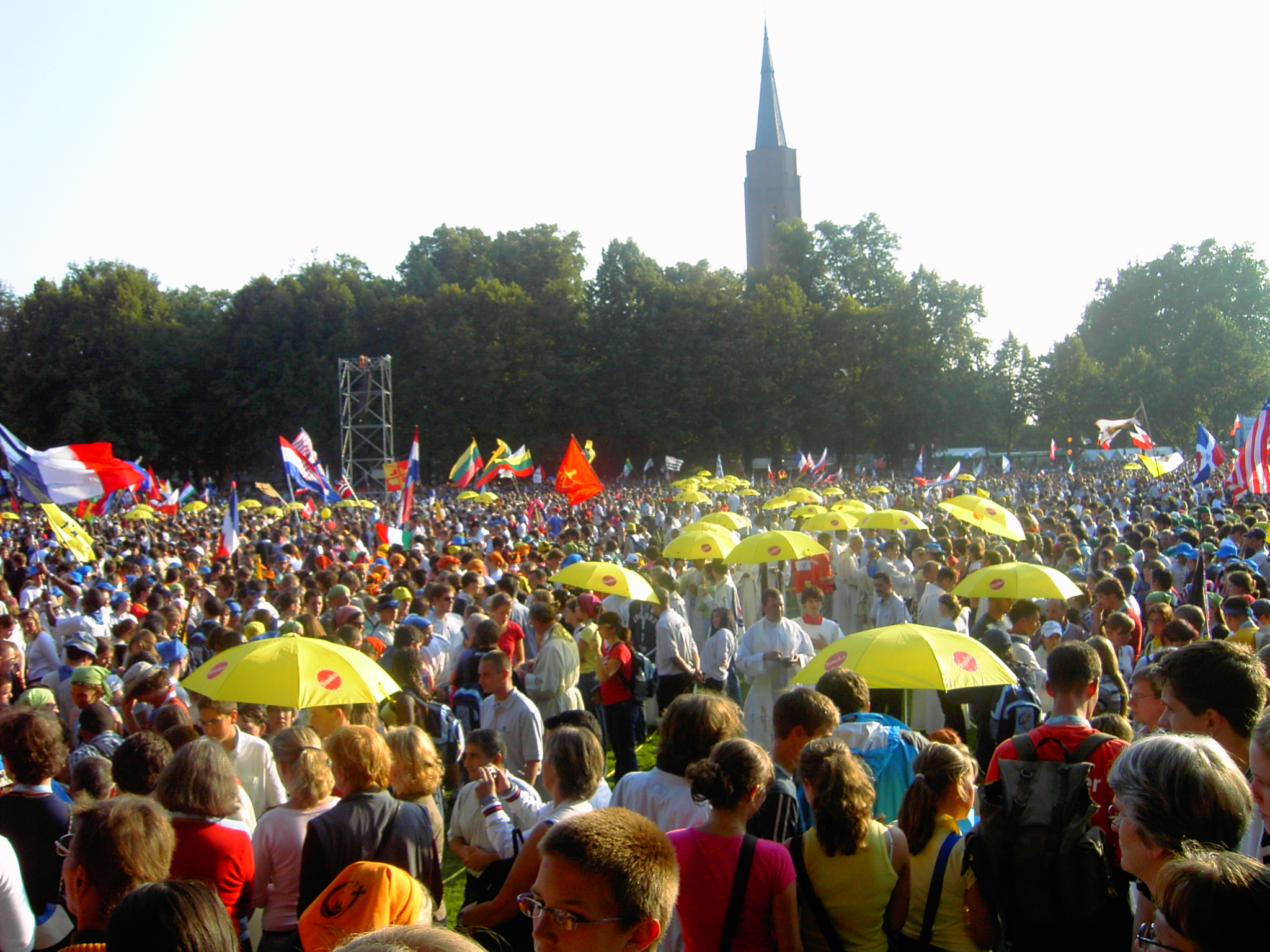
Opening festivities

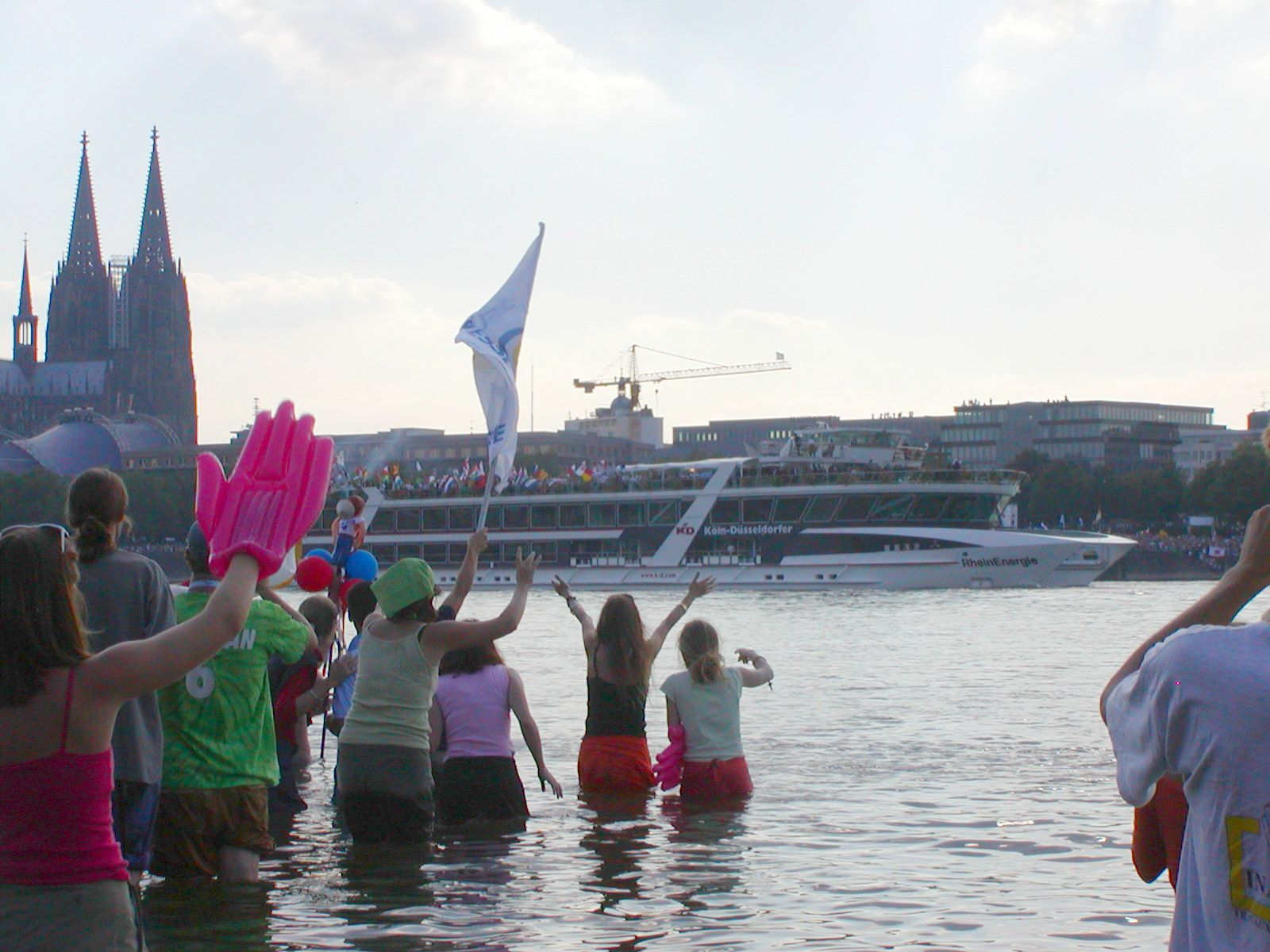
Cheering pilgrims wade into the Rhine during the pope's ride on the Rhine in Cologne

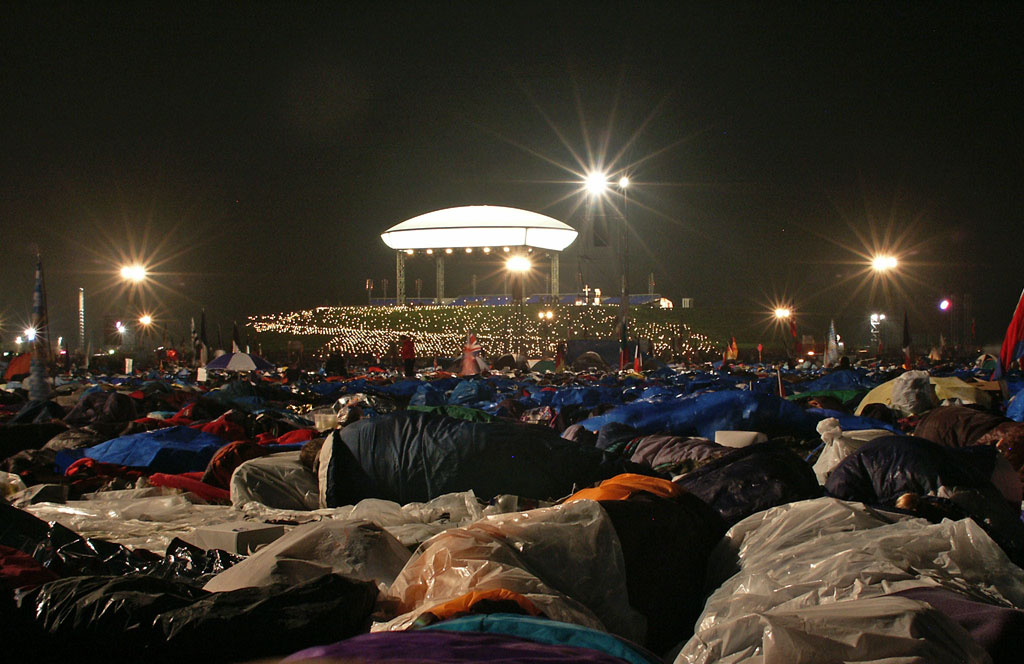
Thousands of sleeping Pilgrims on the night of 20-21 August 2005 at 03:00

== See also ==
- Nightfever, night of prayer event
- World Youth Day
