= Nightfever =

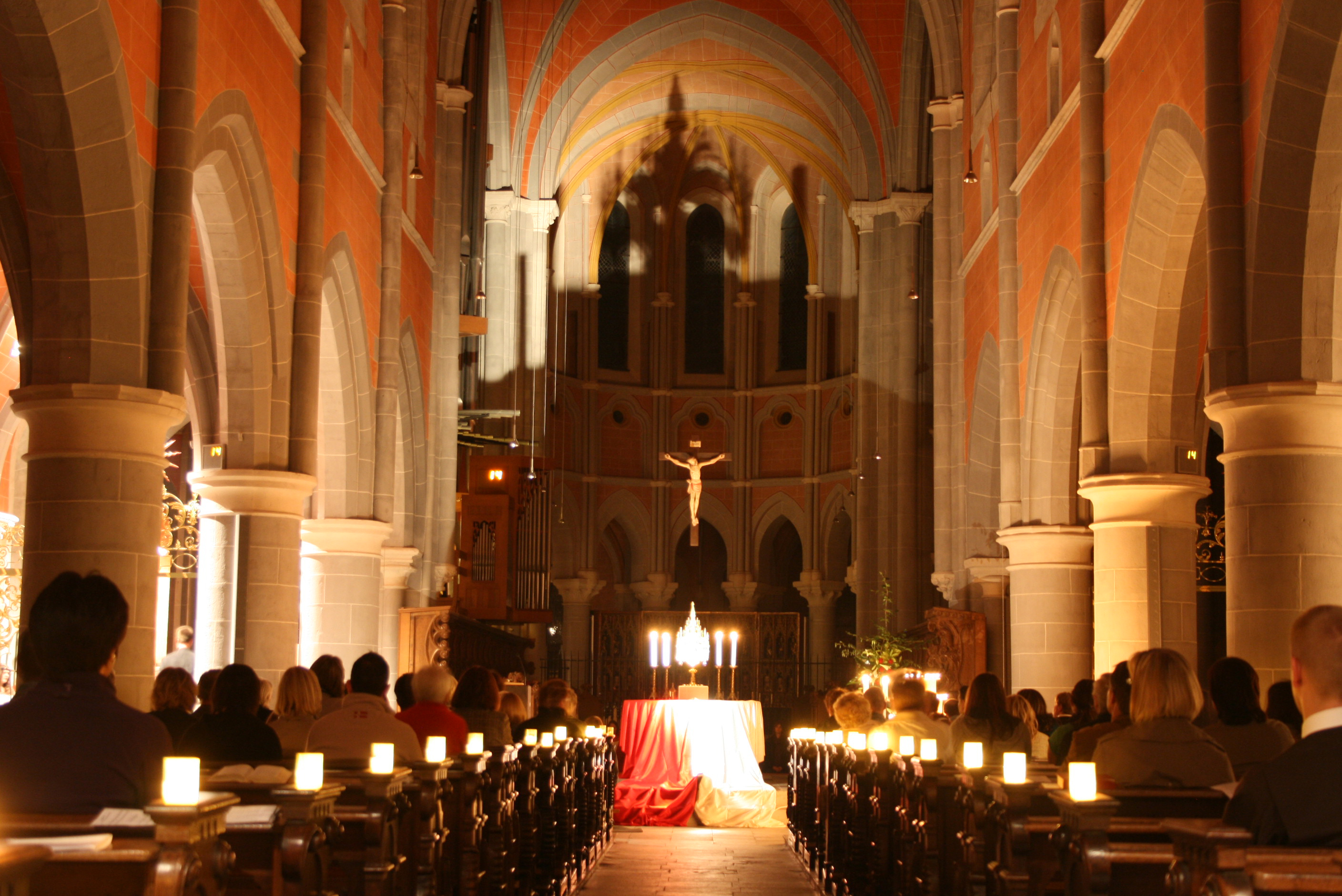
Parishioners at Marienstatt Abbey observe Nightfever.

Nightfever is a night of prayer and part of the Nightfever initiative which is rooted in the Catholic Church. The goal is to help those far away from the Church to encounter God and to experience His love and mercy.

Nightfever events take place in over 80 cities in Europe, North and South America, and Australia., and is especially centered in Germany where it began after the 20th World Youth Day in Cologne. To celebrate Nightfever one must be trained by the Nightfever international team to receive permission.

== History ==
Nightfever was founded by students Katharina Fassler-Maloney, a member of the Emmanuel Community, and Andreas Süß, then a seminarian and today a priest. After World Youth Day 2005 in Cologne the pair thought, "This cannot be the end. This great vibe/spirit of the WYD has to go on in our daily lives…!" Only one event was originally planned, but due to its success it was continued, and then spread across Germany, Europe, and beyond. The first Nightfever in North America was held in Halifax, Nova Scotia, in 2012.

On Saturday nights volunteers stand on streets near bars, theaters, and parties in city centers. They approach strangers and say things such as "Hey, want a candle? We’re praying for peace." If the passerby agrees they are welcomed into the church, or the volunteer walks them to nearby church where the event is taking place. Participants are welcome to light their candle and leave, or to stay and pray for as short or as long of a time as they like. When they leave, "their candles burn on as a symbol of their concerns and thoughts."

In addition to lighting candles at the altar, common elements inside the church include the Eucharistic exposed for adoration, contemporary Christian music, submitting prayer intentions, and priests on hand to administer the Sacrament of Reconciliation or to provide prayer, support, and counsel. Nightfever typically goes late into the night.

As they leave, participants are often given items to take with them. In New York, it is small cards thanking them for coming and quoting Jeremiah 29:11: “For I know the plans I have for you, says the Lord, plans for your welfare and not for evil, to give you a future and a hope.” In Dublin attendees also left with a verse from the Bible to reflect upon, and in Chicago they were given hot chocolate.

An organizer in Britain describes Nightfever as "a door opener. For those who once had faith in God we hope they will be renewed through their experience at St Patrick's. For those who have never met Christ we hope this becomes a moment of fruitful encounter." Events often see hundreds and even thousands of people attend.

== Venues ==
Nightfever takes place in city center Catholic churches.

- Great Britain
  - London, St Patrick's Church, Soho Square
  - Oxford, Blackfriars
  - Gosport, St Mary's RC Church
  - Manchester, Holy Name Church
  - Liverpool, Blessed Sacrament Shrine
  - Sheffield, St Marie's Cathedral
  - Leeds, St Anne's Cathedral
- Scotland
  - Glasgow, St Aloysius Church
  - Edinburgh, Edinburgh University catholic Society
  - Dundee, St Andrew's Cathedral
- Belgium
  - Brussels, St croix Church
  - Liege, St Jean Church
  - Leuven, St Antonius Chapel
- Canada
  - Halifax, St. Mary's Basilica
  - Hamilton, Canadian Martyrs Catholic Church
  - Kingston, St. Mary's Cathedral
- Germany:
  - Aachen, St. Foillan
  - Augsburg, Dom Unserer Lieben Frau
  - Berlin, St. Bonifatius
  - Bonn, St. Remigius
  - Düsseldorf, St. Lambertus
  - Duisburg, Liebfrauenkirche
  - Erfurt, Lorenzkirche
  - Frankfurt, Frankfurter Dom
  - Freiburg, St. Martin
  - Fulda, Heilig-Geist-Kirche
  - Füssen, Krippkirche St. Nikolaus
  - Gummersbach, St. Franziskus
  - Heidelberg, St. Anna
  - Höhr-Grenzhausen, St. Peter und Paul
  - Jena, St. Johannes Baptist
  - Köln, Kölner Dom
  - Mainz, Augustinerkirche
  - München, St. Peter
  - Münster, St. Lamberti
  - Nürnberg, St. Elisabeth
  - Paderborn, Marktkirche
  - Regensburg, St. Johann
  - Saarbrücken, Basilika St. Johann
  - Trier, St. Gangolf
  - Würzburg, Karmelitenkloster Würzburg Maria Magdalena
  - Wuppertal, St. Laurentius
- Austria
  - Graz, Franziskanerkloster
  - Wien, Wiener Minoritenkirche
- Switzerland:
  - Basel, Clarakirche
- Denmark
  - Copenhagen, St. Ansgars
- Netherlands
  - Oldenzaal, St. Plechelmus-Basilika
- The United States of America
  - Holy Name Cathedral, Chicago
  - St. Louis Cathedral, New Orleans, LA
- Mexico
  - Querétaro, San Jose de Gracia
  - Ciudad de México
- Hungary
  - St. Michael, Downtown
