= World Youth Day 1987 =

International Catholic youth event

- Date: 6 April 1987 – 12 April 1987
- Location: Buenos Aires, Argentina
- Type: Youth festival
- Theme: "We have recognized the love that God has for us, and we have believed in it." "Hemos conocido y hemos creído en el amor que Dios nos tiene". (1 Jn 4:16)
- Organised by: Catholic Church
- Participants: Pope John Paul II
- Previous: 1985 Rome
- Next: 1989 Santiago de Compostela
- Website: Vatican

The second World Youth Day 1987 (Spanish: Jornada Mundial de la Juventud 1987) took place on 6 and 12 April 1987 in Buenos Aires, Argentina and was presided by Pope John Paul II. It was the first edition held in a city other than Rome.

== Official announce ==
The headquarters of the 2nd edition of WYD was made official by John Paul II on June 8, 1986.

== Theme ==
The theme chosen by Pope John Paul II for these days is taken from the fourth chapter of the First Epistle of John, verse 16: "And we have recognized the love that God has for us, and we have believed in it".

== Anthem ==
The anthem of these World Youth Days was titled "un nuevo sol" ("a new sun").

== Procedure ==
The WYD of 1987 took place as part of the John Paul's apostolic trip to Uruguay and Argentina which took place from March 31 to April 12, 1987. The Pope arrived in Argentina on 6 April.

=== 11 April ===
The opening Mass was held in the Basilica of Our Lady of Luján, on April 11, 1987. The Vigil prior to the closing Mass was divided into three blocks: Argentine, Latin American and World, for each the Pope directed a different message.

=== 12 April ===
The central act was the closing mass celebrated in front of the Obelisco de Buenos Aires, on April 12, Palm Sunday, in front of over a million people and was the first time that a Pope celebrated a Palm Sunday outside of Rome.

== Audience ==
More than 1 million young people from all over the world gathered at the 9 de Julio Avenue in the Argentine capital to participate in the conference. Its central ceremonies took place at Plaza de Constitución, one of the largest squares of the Argentine capital.

== The Cross ==
The Cross of the World Youth Day was a wooden crucifix of 3.8 m height given to young Catholics by Pope John Paul II at the end of the Holy Year of 1984 with the words "Take it for the world as a sign of the love of the Lord Jesus." For the first time since its institution, the Cross out of Rome to be one of the main symbols of WYD in Buenos Aires 1987.

== Hymn of the World Youth Day 1987 ==
THE NEW CIVILIZATION

The WYD Hymn of Buenos Aires 1987, popularly known as "Un Nuevo Sol" was composed by Alberto Croce and Eugenio Perpetua.

A land that has no borders but hands that together will form a stronger chain that war and that death.

We know it, love is the path

A more just and fraternal homeland where we all build unity where nobody is displaced, because all are called.

We know...

A new sun rises about the new civilization that is born today. A stronger chain that hate and that death We know it, love is the path.

Justice is the force of peace love, who makes forgive. The truth, the force that gives us liberation.

We know...

The one who has shares his wealth and the one who knows does not impose his truth. The boss understands that power is a service.

We know...

The one who believes contagious with his life and the pain is covered with love because the man feels supportive in solidarity with the world.

We know...

== See also ==
- World Youth Day
- Buenos Aires
