= World Youth Day 2013 =

International Catholic youth event

XXVIII World Youth Day
- Date: 23 July 2013– 28 July 2013
- Venue: Copacabana Beach
- Location: Rio de Janeiro, Brazil; 22°58′1″S 43°10′50″W
- Type: Youth festival
- Theme: Go and make disciples of all nations" (Mt 28:19)
- Organised by: Catholic Church
- Participants: Pope Francis
- Previous: 2011 Madrid
- Next: 2016 Kraków

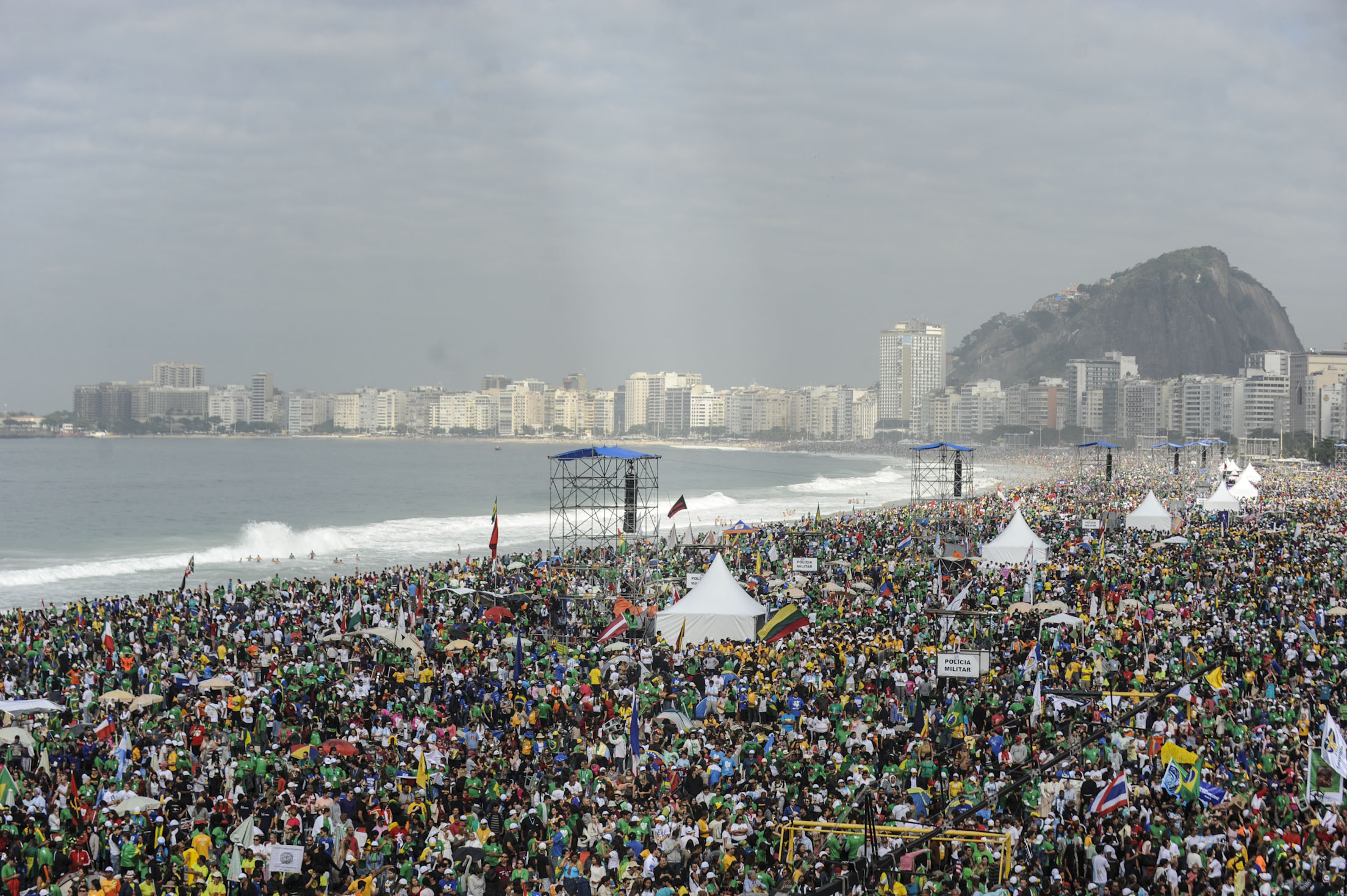
Pilgrim crowds in Rio

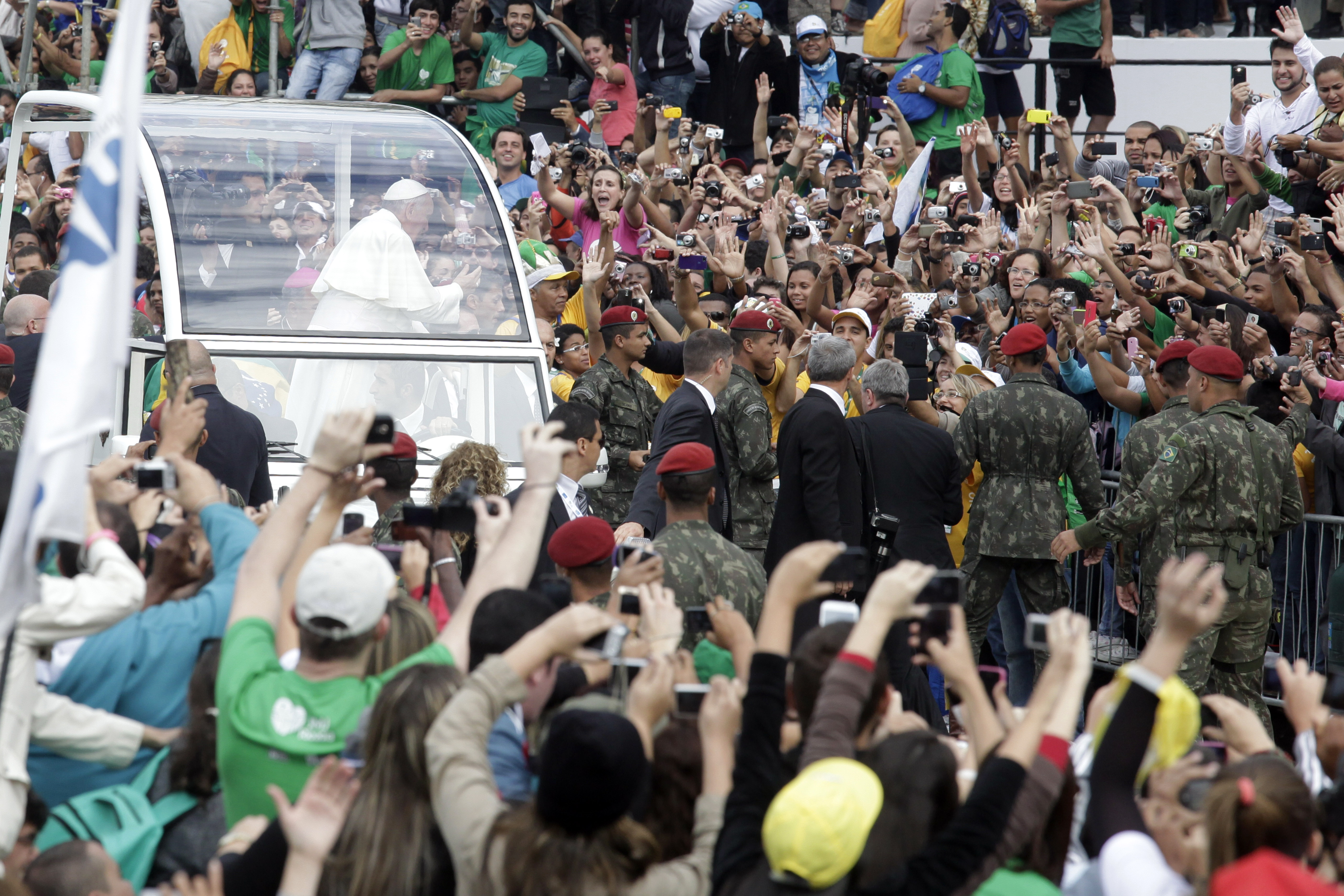
Pilgrims in Rio

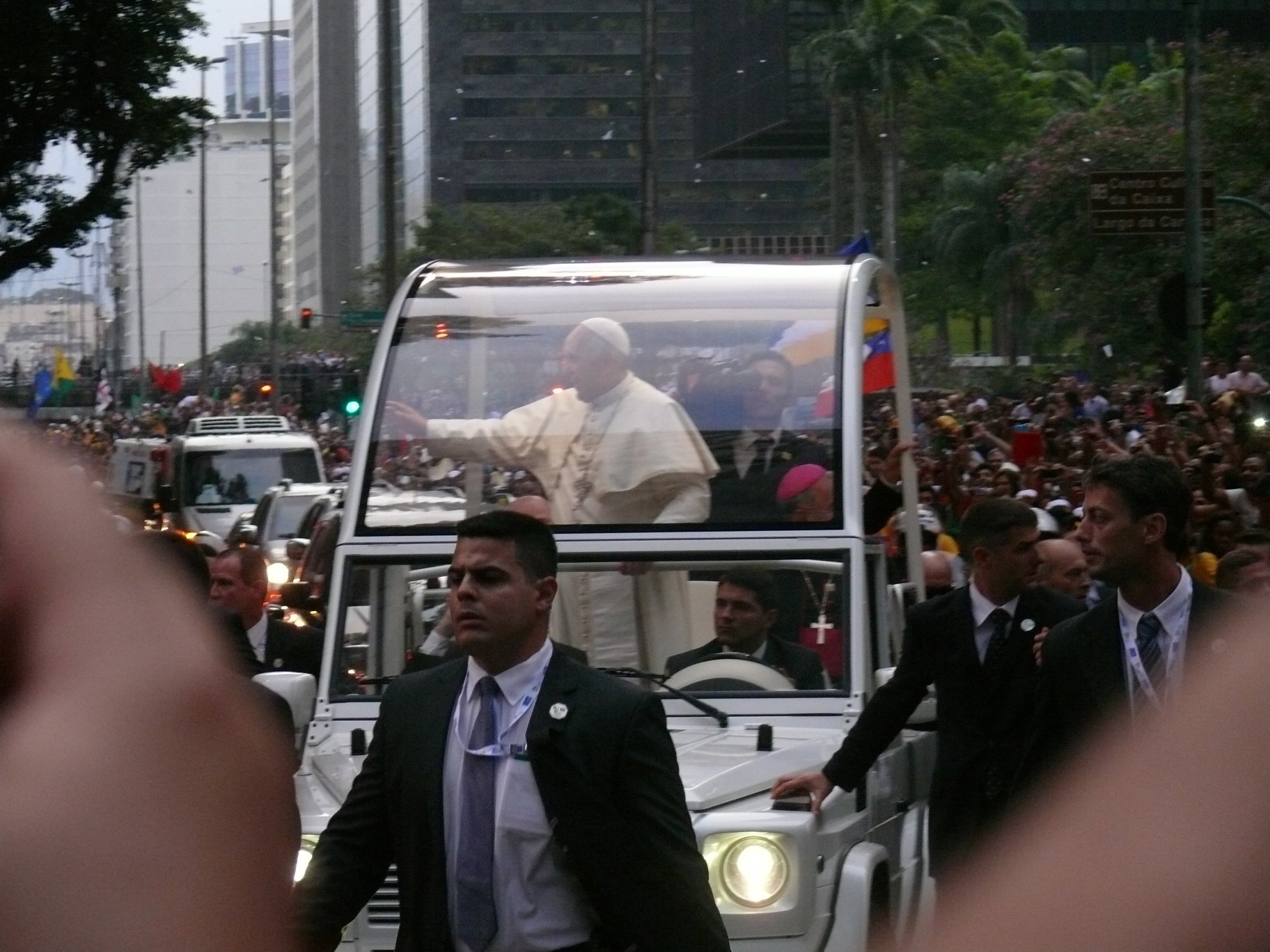
Pope Francis in Rio

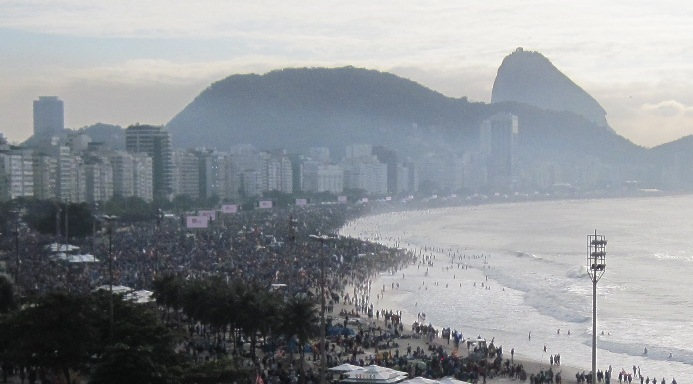
Believers all along Copacabana beach, with the Sugarloaf in the background

World Youth Day 2013 (Portuguese: Jornada Mundial da Juventude de 2013), stylized WYDRio2013, was the 14th international World Youth Day, an international Catholic event focused on religious faith and youth. The host city of World Youth Day 2013 was Rio de Janeiro, Brazil, as announced by Pope Benedict XVI at the end of the closing Mass of World Youth Day 2011 in Madrid, Spain. The events were scheduled to be held from 23 July to 28 July 2013.

World Youth Day 2013 was the second World Youth Day to be held in South America; the second to be held in Latin America with the first being held in Buenos Aires, Argentina, in April 1987; and the third to be held in the Southern Hemisphere. Additionally, World Youth Day 2013 was the first World Youth Day to be held in a country whose primary language is Portuguese, and the first for Pope Francis. The event was attended by over 3 million people.

== Theme ==
On 24 August 2011, Pope Benedict XVI announced the theme for World Youth Day 2013. Taken from the Gospel of Matthew, the theme will be "Go and make disciples of all peoples" (Matthew 28:19).

== Patron saints ==
On Pentecost Sunday, 27 May 2012, the World Youth Day Office released the names of the official patron saints for WYD2013. The saints and blesseds chosen include:

Patrons: Our Lady of Aparecida, Saint Sebastian, Saint Anthony of St. Ann Galvão, Saint Therese of Lisieux, Blessed John Paul II.

Intercessors: Saint Rose de Lima, Saint Teresa of Los Andes, Blessed Laura Vicuña, Saint José de Anchieta, Blessed Albertina Berkenbrock, Blessed Chiara Luce Badano, Blessed Sister Dulce, Blessed Adílio Daronch, Blessed Pier Giorgio Frassati, Blessed Isidore Bakanja, Blessed Frederick Ozanam, Saint George, Saint Andrew Kim and Companions.

== Logo ==
Day 2013 logo incorporates colors and famous symbols of Rio de Janeiro, including the Christ the Redeemer statue, the Sugarloaf Mountain, and coastline and water. The logo was designed by Gustavo Huguenin, a native of Cantagalo, Rio de Janeiro. The logo design was based on the official World Youth Day 2013 theme of the Great Commission from the Gospel of Matthew, and includes the use of colours found in Brazilian flag.

The unveiling of the official logo was postponed by Orani João Tempesta out of respect to the January 2011 natural disasters. The logo was later revealed on 7 February 2012. The official logo was presented to President Dilma Rousseff by Rio de Janeiro governor, Sérgio Cabral Filho on DVD.

== Official song ==
The official song for World Youth Day 2013 was released on 14 September 2012, titled "Esperança do Amanhecer".

== Media ==
The official website for World Youth Day in Rio de Janeiro was www.rio2013.com and offered social networking through Google+, Twitter, Facebook and RSS feed.

From 22–29 July 2013, the youth website Xt3.com webcast all the major events live from Rio de Janeiro, allowing pilgrims from all over the world to participate in World Youth Day online.

Inés San Martín was the head of international communication.

== Pre-World Youth Day incidents ==
In July 2013 it was reported that 320,000 young people had registered for this World Youth Day, although one million had been predicted by the organizers. A Brazilian newspaper reported that Rio organizers had unsuccessfully sought additional funding from government leaders.

A bus-truck crash in western French Guiana (Saint-Laurent-du-Maroni) on 17 July killed 21-year-old Sophie Moriniere, a member of a Paris WYD group, and wounded six others of the 23 young WYD pilgrims from France on the bus. Moriniere had been serving as a special correspondent for Notre Dame Radio. The bus was reportedly on its way to Kourou, French Guiana. Bishop Emmanuel Lafont of the Roman Catholic Diocese of Cayenne in Cayenne celebrated a Mass for the crash victims, while Cardinal Andre Vingt-Trois, Cardinal Archbishop of Paris, asked members of his Archdiocese to pray for the victims. Pope Francis's Cardinal Secretary of State, Tarcisio Cardinal Bertone, S.D.B., sent a formal message of condolence.

A travel firm's bankruptcy affected pilgrims in 20 US dioceses.

Cardinal Barbarin canceled his participation after suffering a heart incident in Guyane, where 700 French WYD pilgrims were stranded due to airliner failure.

== See also ==
- Papal visits to Brazil
