= World Youth Day 1984 =

International Catholic youth event

- Date: April 14, 1984 – April 15, 1984
- Location: Vatican City
- Type: Youth festival
- Theme: Aperite portas Redemptoris
- Organised by: Catholic Church
- Participants: Pope John Paul II
- Next: 1985 Rome

World Youth Day 1984 was an international meeting promoted by Pope John Paul II at the extraordinary Holy Year of the Redemption. It was the first large youth gathering promoted by the Catholic Church. From that experience came the idea of the World Youth Days which since then have been held, every two to four years, in different countries of the world.

The meeting with the Pope took place in Rome on Saturday, April 14, 1984 before Palm Sunday. The young people found themselves in the morning in the square in front of the Basilica of Saint John Lateran for mass, then a long procession went to St. Peter's Square in the Vatican where the meeting took place with the Pope who, for the occasion, was accompanied on stage created on the steps of St. Peter's Basilica by Mother Teresa of Calcutta.

About 300,000 people attended the meeting, mostly Italians, but with a significant presence of young people coming from abroad. Pope John Paul II concluded the Youth Jubilee during the Angelus of Palm Sunday.

The following week, on Easter Sunday, April 22, 1984, the Pope gave the youth the Cross of the World Youth Day as a symbol of "the love of the Lord Jesus for humanity and as an announcement that only in Christ died and resurrected it is salvation and redemption." On this occasion he renewed the appointment for a meeting with the young people for Palm Sunday next, March 31, 1985, in the year that the UN proclaimed International Year of Youth.
