= World Youth Day =

International Catholic youth event

- Map of World Youth Day locations. Countries that have hosted at least one WYD are shaded red.
- Significance: Youth
- Date: Last Sunday of the liturgical year; from 20–26 November, inclusive (in Ordinary Form), or final Sunday of October (in Extraordinary Form)
- Frequency: Annual
- Started by: Pope John Paul II

World Youth Day (WYD) is an event for the youth organized by the Catholic Church that was initiated by Pope John Paul II in 1985. Its concept has been influenced by the Light-Life Movement that has existed in Poland since the 1960s, where during summer camps Catholic young adults over 13 days of camp celebrated a "day of community". For the first celebration of WYD in 1986, bishops were invited to schedule an annual youth event to be held every Palm Sunday in their dioceses. Nicknamed "The Catholic Woodstock", it is celebrated at the diocesan level annually—in most places on Palm Sunday from 1986 to 2020, and from 2021 on Christ the King Sunday—and at the international level every two to four years at different locations. The 1995 World Youth Day closing Mass in the Philippines set a world record for the largest number of people gathered for a single religious event with 5 million attendees. This record was surpassed when 6 million attended a Mass celebrated by Pope Francis—again in the Philippines—20 years later in 2015.

== Traditional process ==
The most emphasized and well known traditional theme is the unity and presence of numerous cultures. Flags and other national declarations are displayed among mainly young people to show their attendance at the events and proclaim their own themes of Catholicism. Such is usually done through chants and singing of other national songs involving a Catholic theme.

Over the course of the major events taking place, national objects are traded between pilgrims. Flags, shirts, crosses, and other Catholic icons are carried amongst pilgrims which are later traded as souvenirs to other people from different countries. A unity of acceptance among people is also common, with all cultures coming together to appreciate one another.

Other widely recognized traditions include the Pope's public appearance, commencing with his arrival around the city in the "Popemobile" and then with his final Mass held at the event. A festival in Sydney (2008) recorded an estimated distance of a 10-kilometre walk as roads and other public transport systems were closed off.

Pope Benedict XVI criticized the tendency to view WYD as a kind of rock festival; he stressed that the event should not be considered a "variant of modern youth culture" but as the fruition of a "long exterior and interior path".

== History ==
=== 1987 to 1993 ===
1987 WYD was held in Buenos Aires, Argentina. 1989 WYD took place in Santiago de Compostela, Spain. 1991 WYD was held in Częstochowa, Poland. 1993 WYD was celebrated in Denver, Colorado, United States.

=== 1995 to 2005 ===
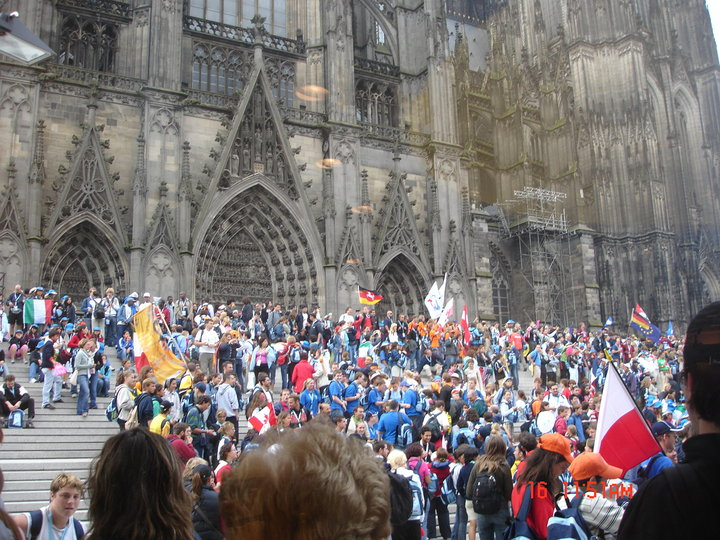
A view of the celebratory vibe outside the Cologne Cathedral in Germany (2005). The participation of Catholics from many countries worldwide results in an enhanced and collaborative spiritual experience.

At WYD 1995, 5 million youths gathered at Luneta Park in Manila, Philippines, an event recognized as the largest crowd ever by the Guinness World Records. In an initial comment immediately following the event, Cardinal Angelo Amato, Prefect of the Congregation for the Causes of Saints, stated that over 4 million people had participated.

1997 WYD was held in Paris. 2000 WYD took place in Rome. 2002 WYD was held in Toronto. 2005 WYD was celebrated in Cologne, Germany. Thomas Gabriel composed for the final Mass on 21 August 2005 the Missa mundi (Mass of the world), representing five continents in style and instrumentation, in a European Kyrie influenced by the style of Bach, a South American Gloria with guitars and pan flutes, an Asian Credo with sitar, an African Sanctus with drums, and an Australian Agnus Dei with didgeridoos.

=== 2008 ===
Sydney, Australia, was chosen as the host of the 2008 World Youth Day celebrations. At the time it was announced in 2005, WYD 2008 was commended by the then Prime Minister of Australia, Kevin Rudd, and the Archbishop of Sydney, Cardinal George Pell. World Youth Day 2008 was held in Sydney, with the Papal Mass held on the Sunday at Randwick Racecourse.

The week saw pilgrims from all continents participate in the Days in the Diocese program hosted by Catholic dioceses throughout Australia and New Zealand. Pope Benedict XVI arrived in Sydney on 13 July 2008 at Richmond Air Force Base. Cardinal Pell celebrated the Opening Mass at Barangaroo (East Darling Harbour) with other activities including the re-enactment of Christ's passion during the Stations of the Cross and the Pope's boat cruise through Sydney Harbour. Pilgrims participated in a variety of youth festivities including visits to St Mary's Cathedral, daily catechesis and Mass led by bishops from around the world, concerts, visits to the tomb of Saint Mary MacKillop, the Vocations Expo at Darling Harbour, reception of the Sacrament of Reconciliation, and praying before the Blessed Sacrament during Adoration. The Mass and concert at Barangaroo saw an estimated crowd of 150,000.

The event attracted 250,000 foreign visiting pilgrims to Sydney, with an estimated 400,000 pilgrims attending Mass celebrated by Pope Benedict XVI on 20 July.

On 12 June 2008, Xt3.com, a Catholic social online network and news site, was launched as the Official Catholic Social Network of WYD. It was considered to be a direct fruit of WYD08, just as Salt + Light Television was a direct fruit of World Youth Day 2002 in Toronto. The name was an abbreviation for "Christ in the Third Millennium" and is operated by the Archdiocese of Sydney, with the support of Archbishop Cardinal George Pell. The site was closed in 2019.

In December 2012, the xt3 team produced a 'Gangnam Style' Advent video.

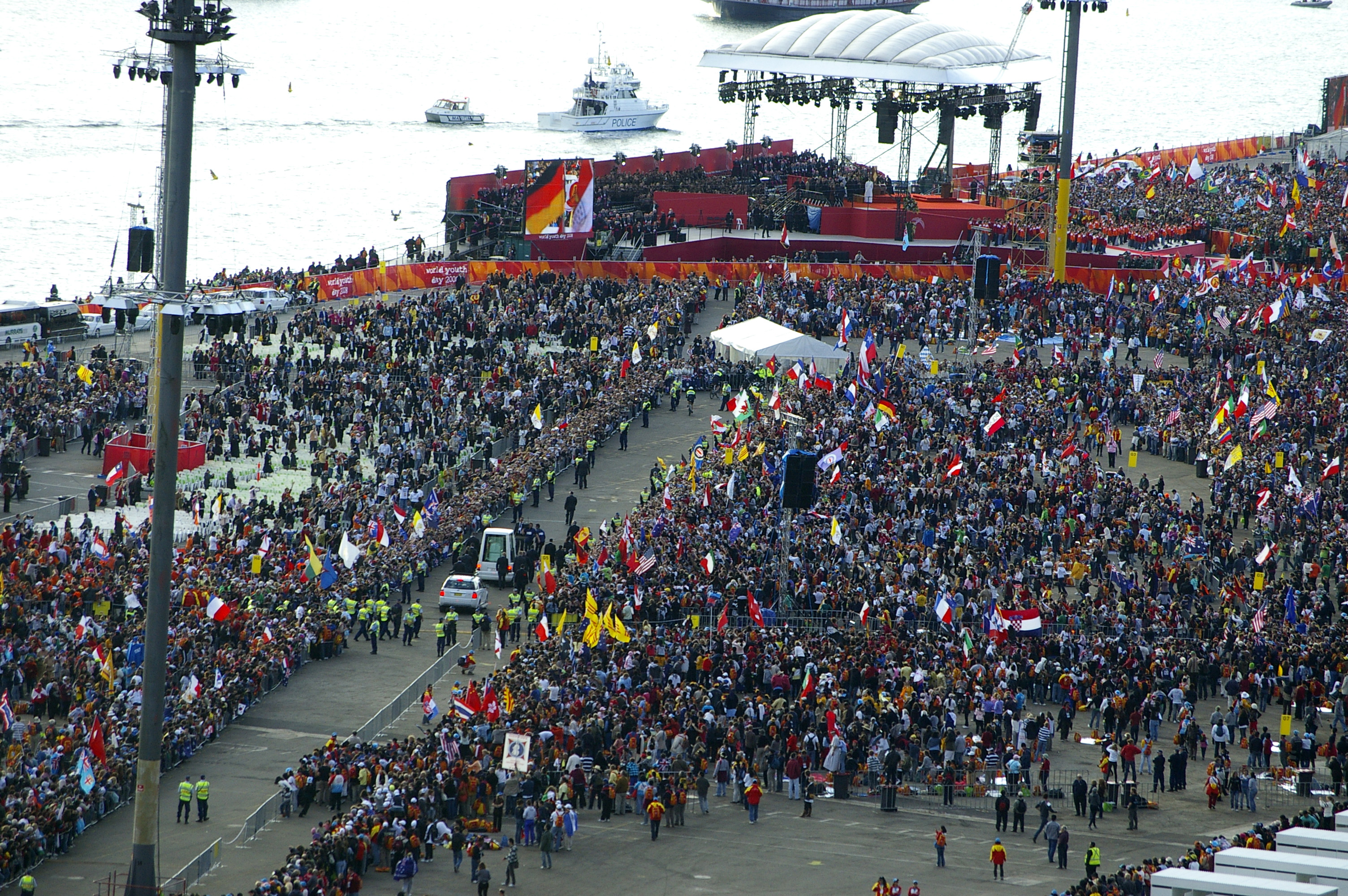
Crowd at Barangaroo, Sydney, for first day of WYD08 celebrations

In May 2007, it was reported that Guy Sebastian's song "Receive the Power" had been chosen as official anthem for World Youth Day (WYD08) to be held in Sydney in 2008. The song was co-written by Guy Sebastian and Gary Pinto, with vocals by Paulini.

"Receive the Power" was used extensively throughout the six days of World Youth Day in July 2008 and also in worldwide television coverage.

In November 2008, a 200-page book, Receive the Power, was launched to commemorate World Youth Day 2008.

=== 2011 ===
Following the celebration of Holy Mass at Randwick Racecourse in Sydney on 20 July 2008, Pope Benedict XVI announced that the next International World Youth Day 2011 would be held in Madrid, Spain. This event was held from 16 to 21 August 2011.

There were nine official patron saints for World Youth Day 2011 in addition to Pope John Paul II: Isidore, John of the Cross, María de la Cabeza, John of Ávila, Teresa of Ávila, Rose of Lima, Ignatius of Loyola, Rafael Arnáiz, and Francis Xavier patron of world missions. During his address to seminarians, Benedict announced that the Spanish mystic and patron of Spanish diocesan clerics St. John of Ávila would become a "Doctor of the Church", a designation granted to only 34 saints throughout the twenty centuries of church history.

An estimated 2,000,000 people attended an all-night vigil to complete the week, more than expected.

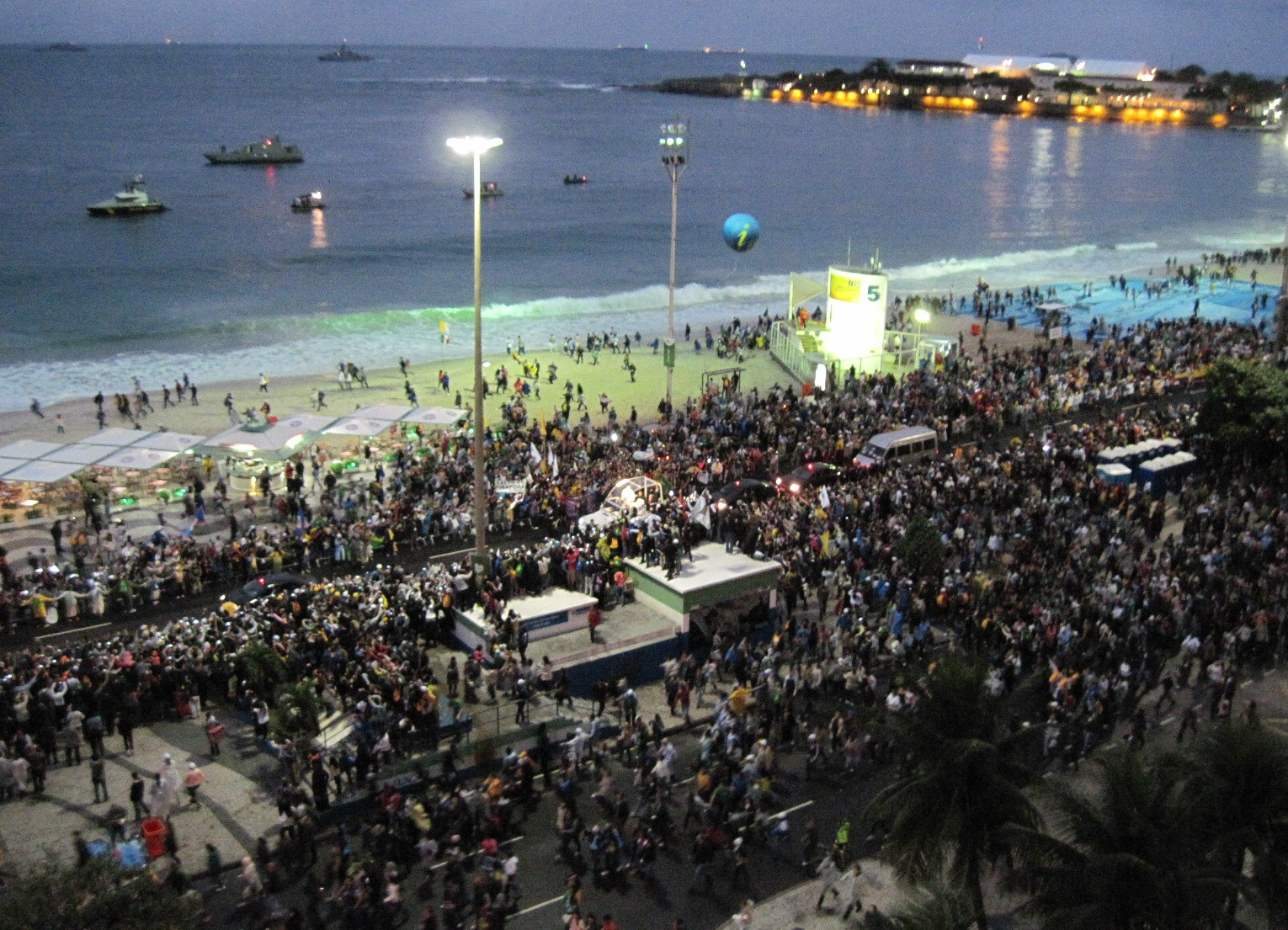
Pope Francis arrives at Copacabana, 26 July 2013

=== 2013 ===
Since 2002, World Youth Day has been held every three years. After the 2011 event the next World Youth Day was scheduled a year earlier than usual, in 2013 in Rio de Janeiro, Brazil, in order to avoid any conflict with the 2014 FIFA World Cup being held in 12 host cities throughout Brazil and the 2016 Summer Olympics being held in Rio de Janeiro. More than 3 Million catholic youth had gathered for the event from across the world.

=== 2016 ===
Pope Francis announced at the end of closing Mass for World Youth Day 2013 that Kraków, Poland, would be the venue for World Youth Day 2016. An estimated three million people attended. Young people from many countries took part in the week-long event which began on 25 July 2016, and ended on 31 July 2016 with an open-air mass led by Pope Francis at Campus Misericordiae. The theme for this year's World Youth Day was "Blessed Are The Merciful, For They Shall Obtain Mercy", tying in closely with the Year of Mercy, which was initiated by Pope Francis on 8 December 2015 and concluded 20 November 2016.

=== 2019 ===
At the Concluding Mass for World Youth Day 2016 in Kraków, Pope Francis announced that Panama City would host World Youth Day in 2019. The World Youth Day was held from Tuesday 22 January until Sunday 27 January.

=== 2023 ===
At the concluding mass in Panama City, Cardinal Kevin Farrell announced that the next World Youth Day would be in Lisbon, Portugal. Originally scheduled to be held in August 2022, the Holy See announced on 20 April 2020 that it was postponed to August 2023 due to the COVID-19 pandemic. 1.5 million pilgrims attended, in particular, the overnight vigil and the concluding mass.

=== 2027 ===
The 2027 World Youth Day will be in Seoul, South Korea, as announced by Pope Francis during the concluding mass at Parque Tejo in Lisbon. It will take place from August 3–8, 2027.

== Chronology of celebrations ==
#	Year	Date	City	Country	Continent	Attendance (Note: Attendance numbers reflect the total number at the closing Mass, which includes many locals who attended only that one event.)	Theme	Anthem	Mass venue	Notes
I	1984	14–15 April	Vatican City	Vatican City	Europe	300,000	Holy Year of the Redemption: A Festival of Hope	"Resta Qui Con Noi"	Saint Peter's Square	Pope John Paul II entrusts the WYD Cross to the Youth; First WYD in Southern Europe; First WYD in Europe; First WYD in a Romance-language-speaking (Italian) country
II	1985	30–31 March	Rome	Italy	Europe	300,000	International Youth Year	"Christus Pax Nostra"	Saint Peter's Square	First WYD outside Vatican City; Second WYD in Southern Europe; Second WYD in Europe
III	1987	6–12 April	Buenos Aires	Argentina	South America	1,000,000	"We have recognized the love that God has for us, and we have believed in it."(1 Jn 4:16)	"Un Nuevo Sol"	Avenida 9 de Julio	First WYD outside Europe; First WYD in South America; First WYD outside Rome to be held outside the months of July/August.; First WYD in Southern Hemisphere
IV	1989	19–20 August	Santiago de Compostela	Spain	Europe	600,000	I am the Way, the Truth and the Life (Jn 14:6)	"Somos Los Jóvenes"	Monte do Gozo	First WYD in Southwestern Europe; Third WYD in Europe
V	1991	10–15 August	Częstochowa	Poland	Europe	1,600,000	You have received a spirit of children (Rom 8:15)	"Abba Ojcze"	Jasna Góra Monastery	First WYD in Central Europe; Fourth WYD in Europe; First WYD in a Slavic-language-speaking (Polish) country; First WYD in the Pope's native country
VI	1993	10–15 August	Denver	United States	North America	700,000	I came that they might have life, and have it to the full (Jn 10:10)	"(We Are) One Body"	Cherry Creek State Park	First WYD in North America; First WYD in a Germanic-language-speaking (English) country
VII	1995	10–15 January	Manila	Philippines	Asia	5,000,000	As the Father has sent me, so am I sending you (Jn 20:21)	"Tell the World of His Love"	Luneta Park	2nd largest Papal gathering (Next to Papal Visit 2015); First WYD held in Southeast Asia; First WYD in Asia; First WYD in an Austronesian-language-speaking (Tagalog) country; Second WYD outside Rome to be held outside the months of July/August.; First WYD to be located inside the tropical zone.; First WYD where all the major events took place in one location
VIII	1997	19–24 August	Paris	France	Europe	1,200,000	Teacher, where do you live? Come and see (cf. Jn 1:38–39)	"Maître Et Seigneur"	Longchamp Racecourse	First WYD in Western Europe; Fifth WYD in Europe
IX	2000	15–20 August	Rome	Italy	Europe	2,000,000	The Word became flesh and dwelt among us (Jn 1:14)	"Emmanuel"	Tor Vergata	Held on the occasion of the Great Jubilee; Third WYD in Southern Europe; Sixth WYD in Europe
X	2002	23–28 July	Toronto	Canada	North America	800,000	You are the salt of the earth ... you are the light of the world (Mt 5:13–14)	"Lumière Du Monde/Light Of The World"	Downsview Park	Last WYD attended by Pope John Paul II; Second WYD in North America
XI	2005	16–21 August	Cologne	Germany	Europe	1,000,000	We have come to worship Him (Mt 2:2)	"Venimus Adorare Eum"	Marienfeld	First WYD attended by Pope Benedict XVI, himself a native German.; Second WYD in Western Europe; Seventh WYD in Europe
XII	2008	15–20 July	Sydney	Australia	Oceania	400,000	You will receive power when the Holy Spirit comes upon you; and you will be my witnesses. (Ac 1:8)	"Receive the Power"	Randwick Racecourse	First WYD in Oceania
XIII	2011	16–21 August	Madrid	Spain	Europe	1,400,000- 2,000,000	Rooted and built up in Jesus Christ, Firm in the Faith (Col 2:7)	"Firmes en la Fe"	Cuatro Vientos Airport	Last WYD attended by Pope Benedict XVI; Second WYD in Southwestern Europe; Eighth WYD in Europe
XIV	2013	23–28 July	Rio de Janeiro	Brazil	South America	3,700,000	Go and make disciples of all nations (Mt 28:19)	"Esperança do Amanhecer"	Copacabana Beach	First WYD attended by Pope Francis, himself from South America; Second WYD in South America; The second WYD where all the major events took place in one location
XV	2016	26–31 July	Kraków	Poland	Europe	3,000,000	Blessed are the merciful, for they will receive mercy. (Mt 5:7)	"Błogosławieni miłosierni"	Brzegi, Wieliczka County	Second WYD in Central Europe; Ninth WYD in Europe; Held on the Occasion of the Extraordinary Jubilee of Mercy; Coincided with the 1050th Anniversary of the Baptism of Poland
XVI	2019	22–27 January	Panama City	Panama	Central America	700,000	I am the servant of the Lord. May it be done to me according to your word (Lk 1:38)	"Hágase en mí, según tu palabra"	Metro Park, Juan Díaz, Panama City	First WYD to take place in Central America; Second WYD to be located inside the tropical zone.; Third WYD outside Rome to be held outside the months of July/August.
XVII	2023 (Note: Originally in 2022 but postponed until 2023.)	1–6 August	Lisbon	Portugal	Europe	1,500,000	Mary arose and went with haste. (Lk 1:39)	"Há Pressa no Ar"	Parque Tejo, Lisbon	Last WYD attended by Pope Francis; First WYD after COVID-19 pandemic; Tenth WYD in Europe; Third WYD in Southwestern Europe
XVIII	2027	3–8 August	Seoul	South Korea	Asia		Take courage! I have overcome the world. (Jn 16:33)	"Confidite Ego Vici Mundum"	Seoul Airport, Seongnam	First WYD to be attended by Pope Leo XIV; Second WYD in Asia; First WYD held in East Asia; First WYD in a Koreanic-language-speaking (Korean) country; First WYD in a Christian-minority country

^{Note 02}This lists languages used in the main international version of the anthem. Local versions of the anthem in other languages (and alternate versions) may have also been produced.

=== Diocesan ===
Diocesan level celebrations (celebrated Palm Sunday, 1986–2020; Christ the King Sunday, 2021–present)
Date	Theme
23 March 1986	Always be prepared to make a defence to anyone who calls you to account for the hope that is in you. (1 Pt 3:15)
27 March 1988	Do whatever he tells you. (Jn 2:5)
8 April 1990	I am the vine, you are the branches. (Jn 15:5)
12 April 1992	Go into all the world and preach the Gospel. (Mk 16:15)
27 March 1994	As the Father sent me, so am I sending you. (Jn 20:21)
31 March 1996	Lord, to whom shall we go? You have the words of eternal life. (Jn 6:68)
5 April 1998	The Holy Spirit will teach you all things. (cf. Jn 14:26)
28 March 1999	The Father loves you. (cf. Jn 16:27)
8 April 2001	If any want to become my followers, let them deny themselves and take up their cross daily and follow me. (Lk 9:23)
13 April 2003	Behold, your mother! (Jn 19:27)
4 April 2004	We wish to see Jesus. (Jn 12:21)
9 April 2006	Your word is a lamp to my feet and light to my path. (Ps 119:105)
1 April 2007	Just as I have loved you; you also should love one another. (Jn 13:34)
5 April 2009	We have set our hope on the Living God. (1 Tim 4:10)
28 March 2010	Good Teacher, what must I do to inherit eternal life? (Mk 10:17)
1 April 2012	Rejoice in the Lord Always (Philip 4:4)
13 April 2014	Blessed are the poor in spirit, for theirs is the kingdom of heaven. (Mt 5:3)
29 March 2015	Blessed are the pure in heart, for they will see God. (Mt 5:8)
9 April 2017	The Mighty One has done great things for me, and holy is his name (Lk 1:49)
25 March 2018	Do not be afraid, Mary, for you have found favour with God (Lk 1:30)
5 April 2020	Young man, I say to you, arise! (Lk 7:14)
21 November 2021 (originally 28 March 2021)	Stand up! I appoint you as witnesses of what you have seen. (Acts 26:16)
20 November 2022	Mary arose and went with haste. (Lk 1:39)
26 November 2023	Rejoicing in hope. (Rom 12:12)
24 November 2024	Those who hope in the Lord will run and not be weary. (Is 40:31)
23 November 2025	You also are my witnesses, because you have been with me. (Jn 15:27)
22 November 2026	Take courage! I have overcome the world. (Jn 16:33)

== Typical schedule of events ==
=== International level ===
World Youth Day – Overview of Week
	Up to week before	Tue	Wed	Thu	Fri	Sat	Sun
Morning	Days in the dioceses: Catechetical sessions around host and nearby dioceses	Day of official arrival and welcome for pilgrims	Catechetical session with participating bishops			Walking pilgrimage to vigil site	Closing ceremonies: Morning prayers are led by participating bishops; Mass is celebrated by the Pope; Next host diocese is announced by the Pope after Mass
Afternoon	Days in the dioceses: Catechetical sessions around host and nearby dioceses	Opening ceremonies: Holy Mass is celebrated by the local ordinary of the host diocese	Afternoon shows, music, prayer and reconciliation opportunities	The Pope officially arrives at WYD and delivers his welcome address at a prayer service	Afternoon shows, music, prayer and reconciliation opportunities	Afternoon shows, music, prayer and reconciliation opportunities at vigil site	
Evening	Days in the dioceses: Catechetical sessions around host and nearby dioceses	Evening shows, music, prayer and reconciliation opportunities			Stations of the Cross	Eucharistic Adoration	

=== Diocesan level ===
At the diocesan level celebrations are decided by a local team usually appointed by the ordinary.

From 1986 to 2020, these celebrations usually occurred during Palm Sunday. They almost always included the Mass of Passion Sunday – when Jesus' entry to Jerusalem in his final days is commemorated. However, on 22 November 2020, Pope Francis has moved the Diocesan Celebration of World Youth Day from Palm Sunday to the Sunday of the Solemnity of Christ the King starting in 2021. Since then, they almost always includes the Mass of the Solemnity of Christ the King of the Universe - the day of the eschatological importance of Jesus.

Music, prayer, reconciliation opportunities, as well as adoration of the Blessed Sacrament may also be part of the celebrations.

== See also ==
- Catholic spirituality
- Catholic youth work
- Eucharistic Congress
- Fellowship of Catholic University Students
- International Federation of Catholic Parochial Youth Movements (Fimcap)
- International Youth Day
- International Youth Year
- Juventutem
- Life Teen
- Medjugorje International Youth Festival
- Universal call to holiness
- Vocational discernment in the Catholic Church
- Youth 2000
