= World Youth Day 1985 =

International Catholic youth event

- Date: March 30, 1985 – March 31, 1985
- Location: Rome, Italy
- Type: Youth festival
- Theme: Christus pax nostra
- Organised by: Catholic Church
- Participants: Pope John Paul II
- Previous: 1984 Youth Jubilee
- Next: 1987 Buenos Aires

World Youth Day 1985 (Italian: Giornata mondiale della gioventù 1985) was a meeting on the occasion of the International Youth Year held in Rome on March 30 and 31 1985 and it was the second great international meeting promoted by the Catholic Church and later named World Youth Day. This was considered the birth of these events, which would begin to be called of this way on the next year.

After the Youth Jubilee celebrated in Rome the year before on the occasion of the Holy Year, Pope John Paul II organized a youth gathering for Palm Sunday in 1985 coinciding with the International Youth Year proclaimed by the UN.

== Before the event ==
Before the young people arrived in Rome, the Pope issued on December 8, 1984, a message for the World Day of Peace devoted to the young. Then John Paul II invited the youth to Palm Sunday to Rome for the World Youth Meeting. The Pope chose Palm Sunday as the date of the meeting because in the previous year, just on Palm Sunday, the Catholic Church celebrated the Jubilee of the Youth, celebrated on the occasion of the Holy Year 1983/1984 (1950 anniversary of the death and resurrection of Jesus Christ).

== The program ==
=== Saturday 30 March ===
The Pope met the young Catholics for the first time in Archbasilica of St. John Lateran at 5:00 pm. The slogan of this great meeting were the words: May you know how to realize the hope that is in you (1 Peter 3:15).

During this meeting the apostolic letter "To the young people of the world", written by the Pope for the occasion, was presented firstly to those present. During the following night, there was the possibility for young people to watch in eucharistic adoration at some churches in the city.

=== Sunday, March 31 ===
The following morning, starting at 6:00 WYD participants formed three parades, which joined at Via della Conciliazione to reach St. Peter's Square together - where the final mass would be celebrated. The sources attest in the morning the presence of about 250,000/ 300,000 people from 70 countries, mostly Italians; but there were about twenty thousand Spaniards and five thousand pilgrims from Eastern European countries (primarily Poland, Yugoslavia and Hungary). Young people from Alaska, Lebanon were also present in Rome, as also from Africa and the Far East. Also noteworthy are the presence of other Christian confessions (especially English Protestants), and even non-Christians (including four hundred Japanese Buddhists).

== The event ==
Although it is not a real WYJ (it is considered a sort of "zero edition"), this meeting has some traits that will characterize all future international events of WYD: for example, participants are given a "pilgrim's bag" and a cap with the logo of the day; for hospitality to pilgrims a network of accommodation facilities in the area is activated; an anthem is composed for the occasion.

== The anthem ==
The song "Resta qui com noi" by the musical group Gen Rosso (texts by V. Ciprì and music by B. Enderle) was composed for the gathering and inaugurated the tradition of adopting an official anthem for each World Youth Day.

== The establishment of WYDs ==
Given the success of the day, the Pope on next December 20 officially proclaimed the establishment of the World Youth Days, which will be held every year in all the dioceses of the world on Palm Sunday (in 1986 it would be called the alternation on two-year cycle diocesan editions and world editions in a city selected by the Pontifical Council for the Laity). John Paul II after World Youth Meeting in Rome decided to announce World Youth Day in 1986.
