= List of pastoral trips made by Pope John Paul II =

Nations visited by Pope John Paul II

During his reign, Pope John Paul II ("The Pilgrim Pope") made 146 pastoral visits within Italy and 104 foreign trips, more than all previous popes combined. In total he logged more than 1,167,000 km (725,000 mi). He consistently attracted large crowds on his travels, some among the largest ever assembled. While some of his trips (such as to the United States and Israel) were to places that were previously visited by Paul VI (the first pope to travel widely), many others were to countries that no pope had previously visited.

== Countries visited ==
Pope John Paul II visited 129 countries during his time as pope:

- Nine visits to Poland
- Eight visits to France (including one visit to Réunion)
- Seven visits to the United States (including two stopovers in Alaska)
- Five visits to Mexico and Spain
- Four visits to Brazil, Portugal, and Switzerland
- Three visits to Austria, Canada, Croatia, Czech Republic (including one visit to Czechoslovakia), Dominican Republic, Germany, Guatemala, Ivory Coast, Kenya, Malta (including one stopover in Luqa,) and Slovakia (including one visit to Czechoslovakia)
- Two visits to Argentina, Australia, Belgium, Benin, Bosnia-Herzegovina, Burkina Faso, Cameroon, Democratic Republic of the Congo, El Salvador, Hungary, India, Nicaragua, Nigeria, Papua New Guinea, Peru, Philippines, Slovenia, South Korea, Uruguay, and Venezuela
- One visit to Albania, Angola, Armenia, Azerbaijan, Bahamas, Bangladesh, Belize, Bolivia, Botswana, Bulgaria, Burundi, Cape Verde, Central African Republic, Chad, Chile, Colombia, Congo, Costa Rica, Cuba, Denmark, East Timor (then part of Indonesia), Ecuador, Egypt, Equatorial Guinea, Estonia, Fiji, Finland, Gabon, Gambia, Georgia, Ghana, Greece, Guam, Guinea, Guinea-Bissau, Haiti, Honduras, Iceland, Indonesia, Ireland, Israel, Jamaica, Japan, Jordan, Kazakhstan, Latvia, Lebanon, Lesotho, Liechtenstein, Lithuania, Luxembourg, Madagascar, Malawi, Mali, Mauritius, Morocco, Mozambique, Netherlands, New Zealand, Norway, Pakistan, Palestinian territories, Panama, Paraguay, Romania, Rwanda, Saint Lucia, San Marino, São Tomé and Príncipe, Senegal, Seychelles, Singapore, Solomon Islands, South Africa, Sri Lanka, Sudan, Swaziland, Sweden, Syria, Tanzania, Thailand, Togo, Trinidad and Tobago, Tunisia, Turkey, Uganda, Ukraine, United Kingdom, Zambia, and Zimbabwe.

In addition, John Paul II made 146 pastoral visits within Italy.

== Travels outside Italy ==
=== 1970s ===
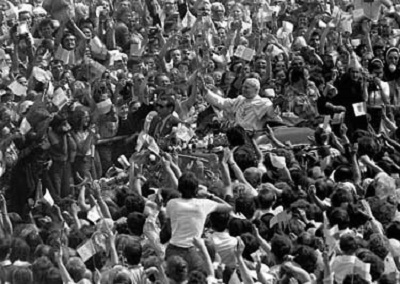
Millions cheer Pope John Paul II during his first visit to Poland as pontiff

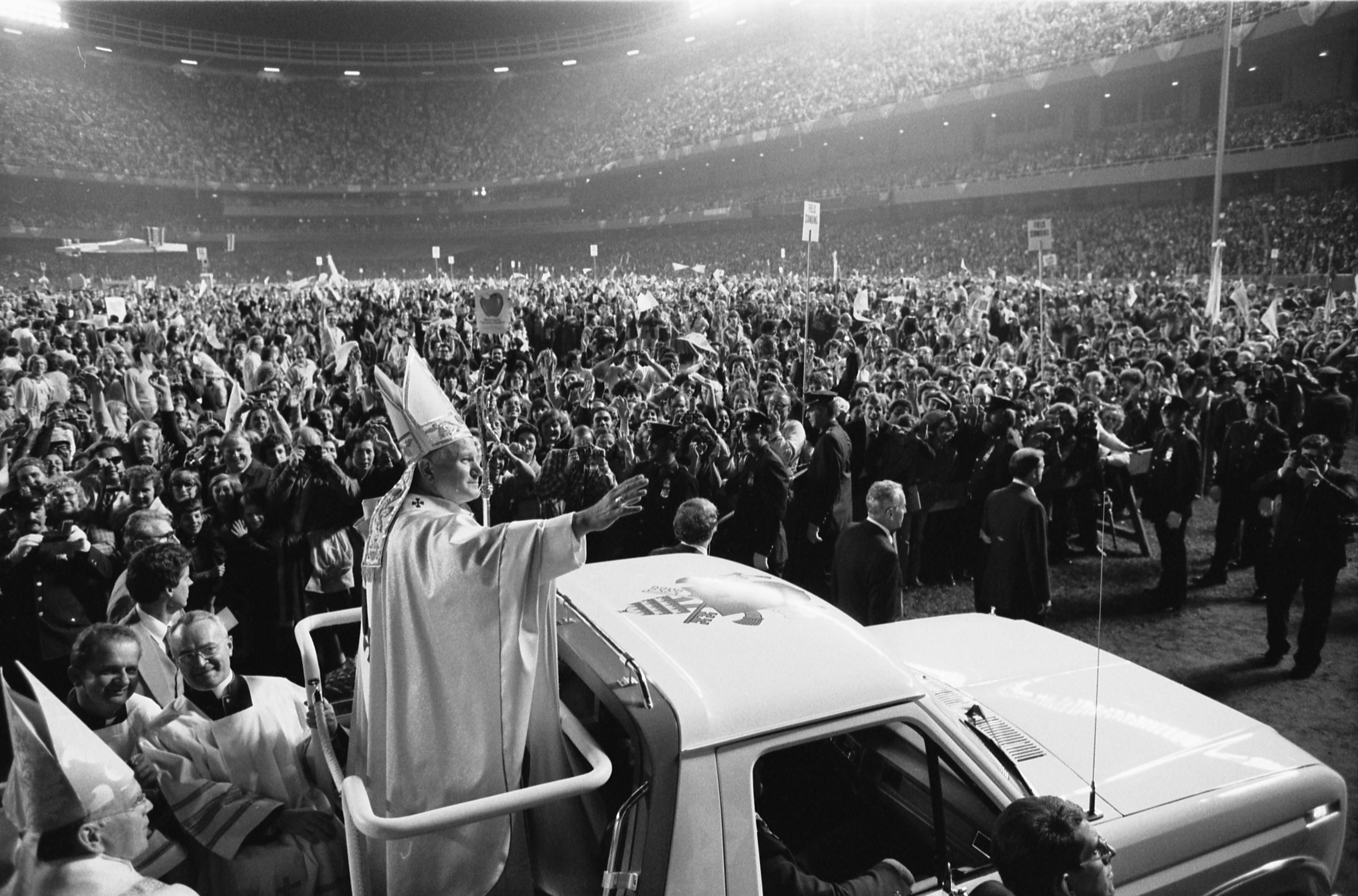
Pope John Paul II, during his first U.S. visit in 1979, at Yankee Stadium, New York City

Pope John Paul II's first foreign journey was a three-country visit to the Dominican Republic, Mexico and the Bahamas in January 1979. Some 20 million people were believed to have greeted the Pope during his stay in Mexico.

The Pope's second foreign visit was to his homeland, Poland, in June 1979. This was possibly the most significant of all his trips as it, according to some historians, set in train a series of events that led to the establishment of the Solidarity trade union, which was a key movement in the fall of Communism in eastern Europe. During his visit to Poland, John Paul visited Warsaw, Gniezno, Kraków, Nowy Targ, Auschwitz, and Jasna Góra. The nine-day tour attracted around 8–10 million faithful.

The Pope's visit to Ireland on 29 September drew immense crowds. 1,250,000 people, one quarter of the population of the island of Ireland, one third of the population of the Republic of Ireland, attended the opening Mass of the visit in Dublin's Phoenix Park. Over 250,000 attended a Liturgy of the Word in Drogheda later that evening. Hundreds of thousands lined the streets of Dublin that night for a motorcade from Dublin Airport to the Presidential Residence in the Phoenix Park.

The following day, Sunday 30 September, included Masses in Galway (300,000), Knock (450,000) and a stop over at the monastic ruins of Clonmacnois (20,000). The final day of the visit began with a visit to the National Seminary in Maynooth (attended by 80,000). The final Mass of the visit was at Greenpark Racecourse in Limerick in the south of the country before 400,000 people which was more than had been expected.

John Paul II made his first visit to the United States in October 1979. He arrived in Boston on 1 October. The next two days were spent in New York City, where he addressed the United Nations General Assembly. There he condemned all uses of concentration camps and torture on the 40th anniversary year of World War II's start in 1939 and subsequent establishment of such camps by both the invading German Nazis and Soviet Communists, with Communism's camps and tortures continuing after the war's end in 1945. The pope later spoke to students gathered at Madison Square Garden, and conducted Mass at the original Yankee Stadium for 75,000 people as well as at Shea Stadium to an audience of over 52,000. He arrived in Philadelphia on 3 October and Des Moines, Iowa on the next day before arriving in Chicago. There he celebrated Mass in Grant Park, met with civic leaders and Chicago's Polish community. Chicago was the largest Catholic archdiocese in the United States at the time and the home of the largest Polish community outside of Poland. He concluded his pilgrimage to the U.S. in Washington, D.C. where he became the first Pope to visit the White House. He was greeted warmly by President Jimmy Carter, and they met privately in the Oval Office.

Voyage	Dates	Nations visited	Places visited	Information
1	25– 26 January 1979	Dominican Republic	Santo Domingo, Santiago de los Caballeros	
1	26 January–1 February 1979	Mexico	México City, Oaxaca de Juárez, Guadalajara, Monterrey	Attended the Third General Conference of the Latin American Bishops held in Puebla
1	1 February 1979	The Bahamas	Nassau	Technical Stopover
2	2–10 June 1979	Poland	Warsaw, Gniezno, Częstochowa, Kraków, Kalwaria Zebrzydowska, Wadowice, Brzezinka, Nowy Targ	Commemoration of the 900th Anniversary of the death of St. Stanislaus and the completion of the Diocesan Synod in Kraków
3	29 September–1 October 1979	Ireland	Dublin, Drogheda, Galway, Knock, Limerick, Maynooth	Centenary of the Knock apparitions.
3	1–7 October 1979	United States	Boston, New York City, Philadelphia, Des Moines, Chicago, Washington, D.C.	Address to the United Nations General Assembly
4	28–30 November 1979	Turkey	Istanbul, İzmir, Ankara	Met with Patriarch Demetrios I of Constantinople and Patriarch Shenork I Kaloustian of Constantinople

=== 1980s ===
On 3 June 1980, he made a pilgrimage to Lisieux in northern France, the home town of St. Therese of the Child Jesus of the Holy Face. In 1997 he declared St. Therese the third woman Doctor of the Church. His 1980 visit to France was the first by a pope since 1814 and his journey to West Germany in November 1980 was the first since 1782.

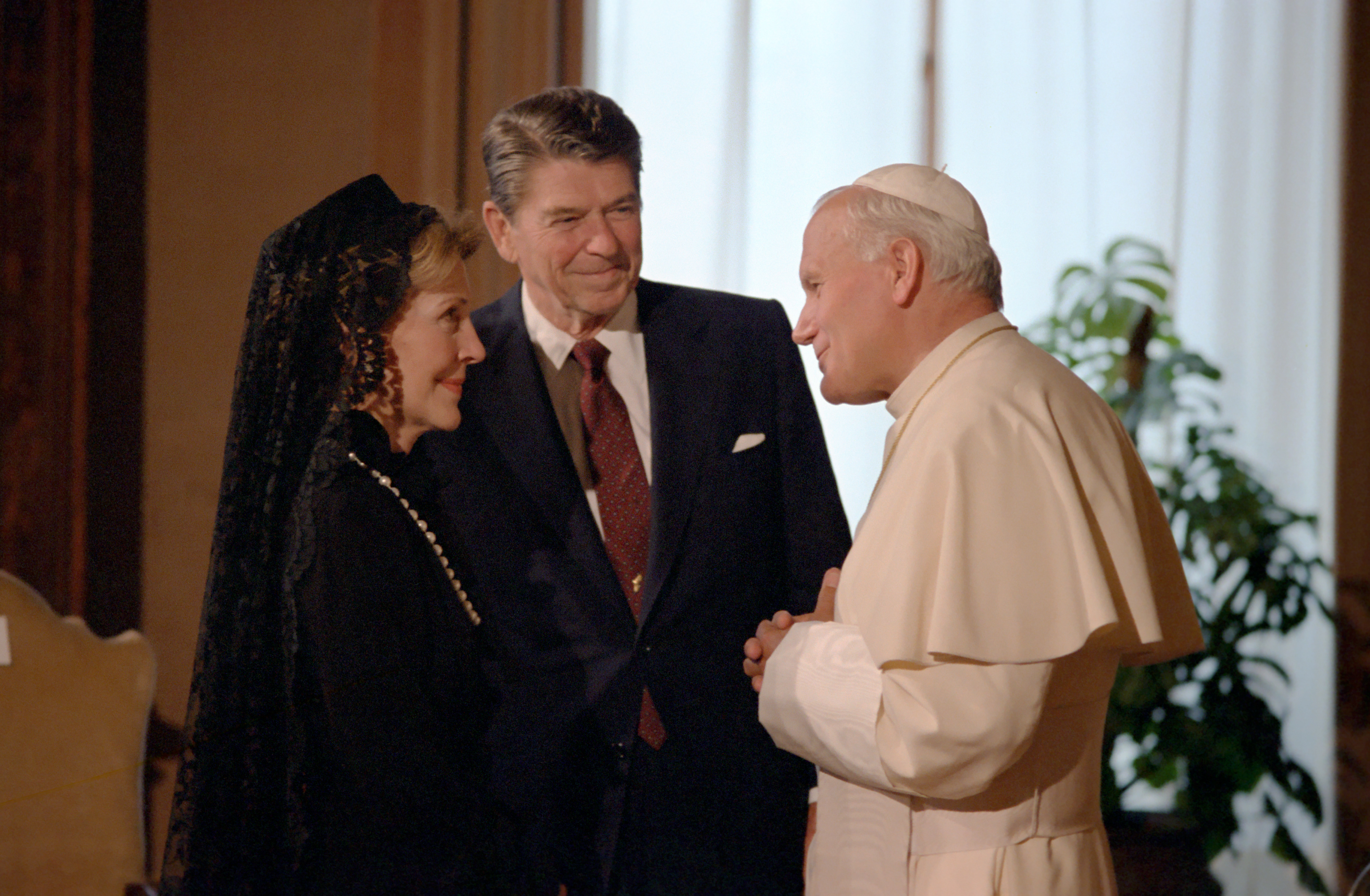
The Pope with U.S. President Ronald Reagan and First Lady Nancy Reagan, 1982

On 18 February 1981, he beatified several martyrs, including those later canonized, St. Lorenzo Ruiz and Magdalene of Nagasaki, in Manila. This was the first beatification to be held outside Vatican City. He became the first reigning pope to travel to the United Kingdom in 1982, where he met Queen Elizabeth II, the Supreme Governor of the Church of England. This trip was in danger of being cancelled due to the then current Falklands War (Spanish: Guerra de las Malvinas/Guerra del Atlántico Sur), against which he spoke out during the visit. In a dramatic symbolic gesture, he knelt in prayer alongside Archbishop of Canterbury Robert Runcie, in the See of the Church of England, Canterbury Cathedral, founded by St Augustine of Canterbury. They prayed at the site of the martyrdom of St. Thomas Becket, meant as a show of friendship between the Roman Catholic and Anglican churches. Pope John Paul II was the first Pontiff to visit Scotland, where about 300,000 of the Roman Catholic minority in that country celebrated Mass with the Pope at Bellahouston Park. On this visit the Pope faced protest from Protestant pastor Jack Glass and his followers. This visit had to be balanced for fairness with an unscheduled trip to Argentina that June.

Throughout his trips, he stressed his devotion to the Virgin Mary through visits to various shrines to the Virgin Mary, notably Knock in Ireland, Fatima in Portugal, Guadalupe in Mexico, Aparecida in Brazil and Lourdes in France.

In 1984, John Paul became the first Pope to visit Puerto Rico. Stands were specially erected for him at Luis Muñoz Marín International Airport in San Juan, where he met with governor Carlos Romero Barceló, and at Plaza Las Americas.

The pope made a pastoral trip to Singapore in 1986, and was received by the Prime Minister Lee Kuan Yew in the Istana. Following that, the Pope made pastoral speeches concerning the Catholic doctrines in the National Stadium of Singapore, which was viewed by a large audience.

Voyage	Dates	Nations visited	Places visited	Information
5	2–6 May 1980	Zaire	Kinshasa, Kisangani	Centenary of the Evangelization of Zaire and Ghana.
5	5 May 1980	Republic of the Congo	Brazzaville	
5	6–8 May 1980	Kenya	Nairobi	
5	8–10 May 1980	Ghana	Accra, Kumasi	
5	10 May 1980	Upper Volta	Ouagadougou	Pope John Paul II and Archbishop Paul Zoungrana
5	10–12 May 1980	Ivory Coast	Abidjan, Adzopé	
6	30 May–2 June 1980	France	Lisieux	First papal visit to France since 1814. Pilgrimage and Visit to UNESCO
7	30 June–12 July 1980	Brazil	Brasília, Belo Horizonte, Rio de Janeiro, São Paulo, Aparecida, Porto Alegre, Curitiba, Salvador, Recife, Teresina, Belém, Fortaleza, Manaus	Inauguration of the 10th National Eucharistic Congress and the 25th Anniversary of CELAM. In visit at S. Paulo, the car was driven by Og Pozzoli
8	15–19 November 1980	West Germany	Cologne, Osnabrück, Mainz, Fulda, Altötting, Munich	First papal visit to Germany since 1782. Commemoration of the 700th Anniversary of the death of St. Albert the Great
9	16 February 1981	Pakistan	Karachi	Stopover
9	17–22 February 1981	Philippines	Manila, Parañaque, Quezon City, Cebu, Davao, Bacolod, Iloilo, Legazpi, Baguio, Morong	Beatification of Lorenzo Ruiz and Companions in Manila. The first beatification outside Rome since the institution of solemn beatification in 1662.
9	22–23 February 1981	Guam	Agaña	Stopover
9	23–26 February 1981	Japan	Tokyo, Hiroshima, Nagasaki	
9	26 February 1981	United States	Anchorage	Second visit to U.S.; Stopover
10	12–17 February 1982	Nigeria	Lagos, Onitsha, Enugu, Kaduna, Ibadan	
10	17 February 1982	Benin	Cotonou	
10	18 February 1982	Equatorial Guinea	Malabo, Bata	
10	18–19 February 1982	Gabon	Libreville	
11	12–15 May 1982	Portugal	Lisbon, Fátima, Coimbra, Braga, Porto	Pilgrimage to Fatima in thanksgiving to Our Lady for saving him from the assassination attempt on his life.
12	28 May–2 June 1982	United Kingdom	London, Canterbury, Coventry, Liverpool, Manchester, York, Edinburgh, Glasgow, Cardiff	
13	11 June 1982	Brazil	Rio de Janeiro	Plane transfer coming from Rome at the Galeão International Airport with a speech to the Brazilian people.
13	11–12 June 1982	Argentina	Buenos Aires	Argentina was at war at the time. Requested peace and to avert conflict between Argentina and United Kingdom.
14	15 June 1982	Switzerland	Geneva	Addressed the 68th Session of the International Workers Conference
15	29 August 1982	San Marino	San Marino	
16	31 October–9 November 1982	Spain	Madrid, Salamanca, Toledo, Segovia, Sevilla, Granada, San Sebastián, Javier, Zaragoza, Barcelona, Valencia, Santiago de Compostela	Closing of the 400th anniversary of the death of Teresa of Ávila. Beatified Angela de la Cruz Guerrero in Sevilla.
17	2 March 1983	Portugal	Lisbon	Second visit to Portugal; Technical Stopover
17	2–3 March 1983	Costa Rica	San José	
17	4 March 1983	Nicaragua	Managua, León	
17	5 March 1983	Panama	Panama City	
17	6 March 1983	Costa Rica	San José	
17	6 March 1983	El Salvador	San Salvador	
17	6–7 March 1983	Guatemala	Guatemala City	
17	8 March 1983	Honduras	Tegucigalpa, San Pedro Sula	
17	9 March 1983	Guatemala	Guatemala City	
17	9 March 1983	Belize	Belize City	
17	9 March 1983	Haiti	Port-au-Prince	Closing of the National Eucharistic and Marian Congress
18	16–23 June 1983	Poland	Warsaw, Częstochowa, Niepokalanów, Szczecin, Kamień Pomorski, Poznań, Katowice, Wrocław, Kraków	Second visit to Poland; 600th Anniversary of the arrival of Our Lady of Jasna Góra in Częstochowa. Beatification of Raphael Kalinowski, Albert Chmielowski in Kraków, and Ursula Ledóchowska in Poznań, visit with then newly released Lech Wałęsa.
19	14–15 August 1983	France	Lourdes	Second visit to France; Pilgrimage to Lourdes on the occasion of the 125th Anniversary of the Lourdes Apparitions and the 50th Anniversary of the Canonization of St. Bernadette Soubirous.
20	10–13 September 1983	Austria	Vienna	Participation in the fourteenth Katholikentag
21	2 May 1984	United States	Fairbanks	Stopover. Third visit to U.S.
21	3-7 May 1984	South Korea	Seoul, Taegu, Busan	200 Years of Roman Catholicism in Korea and Canonization of 103 martyrs in Seoul
21	7-8 May 1984	Papua New Guinea	Port Moresby	Centenary of the Arrival of the first Missionaries in Papua New Guinea
21	9 May 1984	Solomon Islands	Honiara, Guadalcanal	
21	10 May 1984	Papua New Guinea	Port Moresby	
21	10-11 May 1984	Thailand	Bangkok, Phanat Nikhom, Sampran	In gratitude to the Thai people for accepting refugees from the Indochina Peninsula
22	12–17 June 1984	Switzerland	Lugano, Einsiedeln, Sion	Second visit to Switzerland; 1000th Anniversary of the Abbey of Einsiedeln.
23	9–20 September 1984	Canada	Quebec City, Cap-de-la-Madeleine, Montreal, St. John's, Toronto, Winnipeg, Vancouver, Abbotsford, Edmonton, Moncton, Halifax	First visit to Canada; 200th Anniversary of the establishment of the Catholic Church in Newfoundland.
24	10–11 October 1984	Spain	Zaragoza	Second visit to Spain
24	11-12 October 1984	Dominican Republic	Santo Domingo	Inauguration of the 9 year preparation for the 500th anniversary of the discovery and evangelization of the New World.
24	12 October 1984	Puerto Rico	San Juan	Inauguration of the 9 year preparation for the 500th anniversary of the discovery and evangelization of the New World.
25	26 -29 January 1985	Venezuela	Caracas	
25	29 January-1 February 1985	Ecuador	Quito, Latacunga, Cuenca, Guayaquil	
25	1–5 February 1985	Peru	Lima, Cuzco, Arequipa, Callao	
25	5 February 1985	Trinidad and Tobago	Port of Spain	
26	11–15 May 1985	Netherlands	Eindhoven, 's-Hertogenbosch, Utrecht, The Hague, Maastricht, Amersfoort	
26	15–16 May 1985	Luxembourg	Luxembourg	
26	16–21 May 1985	Belgium	Brussels, Ghent, Mechelen, Beauraing, Namur, Laken, Leuven, Banneux	
27	8–10 August 1985	Togo	Lomé, Togoville	
27	10 August 1985	Ivory Coast	Abidjan	Second visit to Ivory Coast; Dedication of the Cathedral in Abidjian.
27	10–14 August 1985	Cameroon	Douala, Yaoundé	
27	14 August 1985	Central African Republic	Bangui	
27	14–16 August 1985	Zaire	Kinshasa, Lubumbashi	Second visit to Zaire; Beatification of Marie-Clémentine Anuarite Nengapeta.
27	16–18 August 1985	Kenya	Nairobi	Conclusion of the 43rd International Eucharistic Congress
27	19 August 1985	Morocco	Casablanca	
28	8 September 1985	Switzerland	Kloten	Third visit to Switzerland
28	8 September 1985	Liechtenstein	Eschen–Mauren, Vaduz	
29	31 January–10 February 1986	India	New Delhi, Calcutta, Madras, Goa, Cochin, Ernakulam, Thrissur, Kottayam, Trivandrum, Bombay, Pune	
30	1–7 July 1986	Colombia	Bogotá, Chiquinquirá, Popayán, Tumaco, Cali, Chinchiná, Lérida, Armero, Pereira, Medellín, Bucaramanga, Cartagena de Indias, Barranquilla	400th Anniversary of the Miraculous restoration of Our Lady of the Rosary of Chiquinquira
30	7 July 1986	Saint Lucia	Castries	
31	4–7 October 1986	France	Lyon, Ars-sur-Formans, Annecy, Paray-le-Monial	Third visit to France; Beatification of Antoine Chevrier and Celebration of the 200th Anniversary of the birth of St. Jean Marie Vianney.
32	19 November 1986	Bangladesh	Dhaka	
32	20 November 1986	Singapore	Singapore	
32	21-22 November 1986	Fiji	Suva, Nadi	
32	22–24 November 1986	New Zealand	Auckland, Wellington, Christchurch	
32	24 November–1 December 1986	Australia	Canberra, Brisbane, Sydney, Hobart, Melbourne, Darwin, Alice Springs, Adelaide, Perth	
32	1 December 1986	Seychelles	Victoria	
33	1 April 1987	Uruguay	Montevideo	
33	1–6 April 1987	Chile	Santiago, Valparaíso, Punta Arenas, Puerto Montt, Concepción, Temuco, Coquimbo, Antofagasta	Thanksgiving to God for a peaceful solution to the long-term territorial conflict between Argentina and Chile
33	6–12 April 1987	Argentina	Buenos Aires, Bahía Blanca, Viedma, Mendoza, Córdoba, Salta, Rosario	Second visit to Argentina; celebration of World Youth Day in Buenos Aires
34	30 April-4 May 1987	West Germany	Augsburg, Essen, Kevelaer, Münster, Cologne	Second visit to West Germany; beatification in Cologne
35	8–14 June 1987	Poland	Warsaw, Lublin, Tarnów, Kraków, Szczecin, Gdynia, Gdańsk, Częstochowa, Łódź	Beatification of Karolina Kózka and Michał Kozal and participation at the 2nd National Eucharistic Congress in Warsaw. 11 June 1987 Pope John Paul II arriving at the military airport at Gdynia on his third Papal visit to Poland.
36	10–19 September 1987	United States	Miami, Columbia, SC, New Orleans, San Antonio, Phoenix, Los Angeles, Monterey, San Francisco, Detroit, Hamtramck, Pontiac	Speech to motion picture, television, magazine publishing, broadcasting and music recording executives at Registry Hotel (Los Angeles, 15th).
36	20 September 1987	Canada	Fort Simpson	Second visit to Canada; Visit to the indigenous people, who he couldn't visit during his first Canadian trip in 1984 due to bad weather conditions.
37	7–9 May 1988	Uruguay	Montevideo, Florida, Melo, Salto	Second visit to Uruguay
37	9–14 May 1988	Bolivia	La Paz, Santa Cruz de la Sierra, Trinidad	
37	14–16 May 1988	Peru	Lima	Second visit to Peru; Closing of the 5th Eucharistic and Marian Congress in Lima
37	16–18 May 1988	Paraguay	Asunción, Villarrica, Mariscal Estigarribia,	Canonization of St. Roque Gonzalez and Companions
38	23–27 June 1988	Austria	Vienna, Linz, St. Pölten, Trausdorf an der Wulka, Gurk, Salzburg, Innsbruck, Eisenstadt	Second visit to Austria
39	10–13 September 1988	Zimbabwe	Harare, Bulawayo	
39	13–14 September 1988	Botswana	Gaborone	
39	14–16 September 1988	Lesotho	Maseru	South Africa was excluded from the itinerary because of apartheid, although the flight to Maseru Airport was redirected to Johannesburg Airport and the pope travelled overland to Lesotho.
39	16 September 1988	Swaziland	Mbabane	
39	16–19 September 1988	Mozambique	Beira, Maputo, Nampula	
40	8–11 October 1988	France	Strasbourg, Metz, Nancy, Mulhouse	Fourth visit to France. Address to the European Parliament in Strasbourg. Was the target on the 11th of heckling by Ian Paisley.
41	28 April–1 May 1989	Madagascar	Antananarivo	Beatification of Victoria Rasoamanarivo
41	1–2 May 1989	Réunion	Saint-Denis	Fifth visit to France (Réunion); Beatification of Jean-Bernard Rousseau
41	2–4 May 1989	Zambia	Lusaka, Ndola, Kitwe	
41	5–6 May 1989	Malawi	Blantyre, Lilongwe	
42	1–3 June 1989	Norway	Oslo, Trondheim, Tromsø	
42	3–4 June 1989	Iceland	Reykjavík, Þingvellir	
42	4–6 June 1989	Finland	Helsinki, Turku	
42	6–7 June 1989	Denmark	Copenhagen, Øm	
42	8–10 June 1989	Sweden	Stockholm, Uppsala, Linköping, Vadstena	
43	19–21 August 1989	Spain	Santiago de Compostela, Covadonga	Third visit to Spain; Celebration of World Youth Day in Santiago de Compostela
44	7–9 October 1989	South Korea	Seoul	Second visit to South Korea, 44th International Eucharistic Congress
44	9–13 October 1989	Indonesia	Jakarta, Yogyakarta, Maumere, Dili, Medan	
44	14–16 October 1989	Mauritius	Port Louis, Moka, Rodrigues, Sainte-Croix	

=== 1990s ===
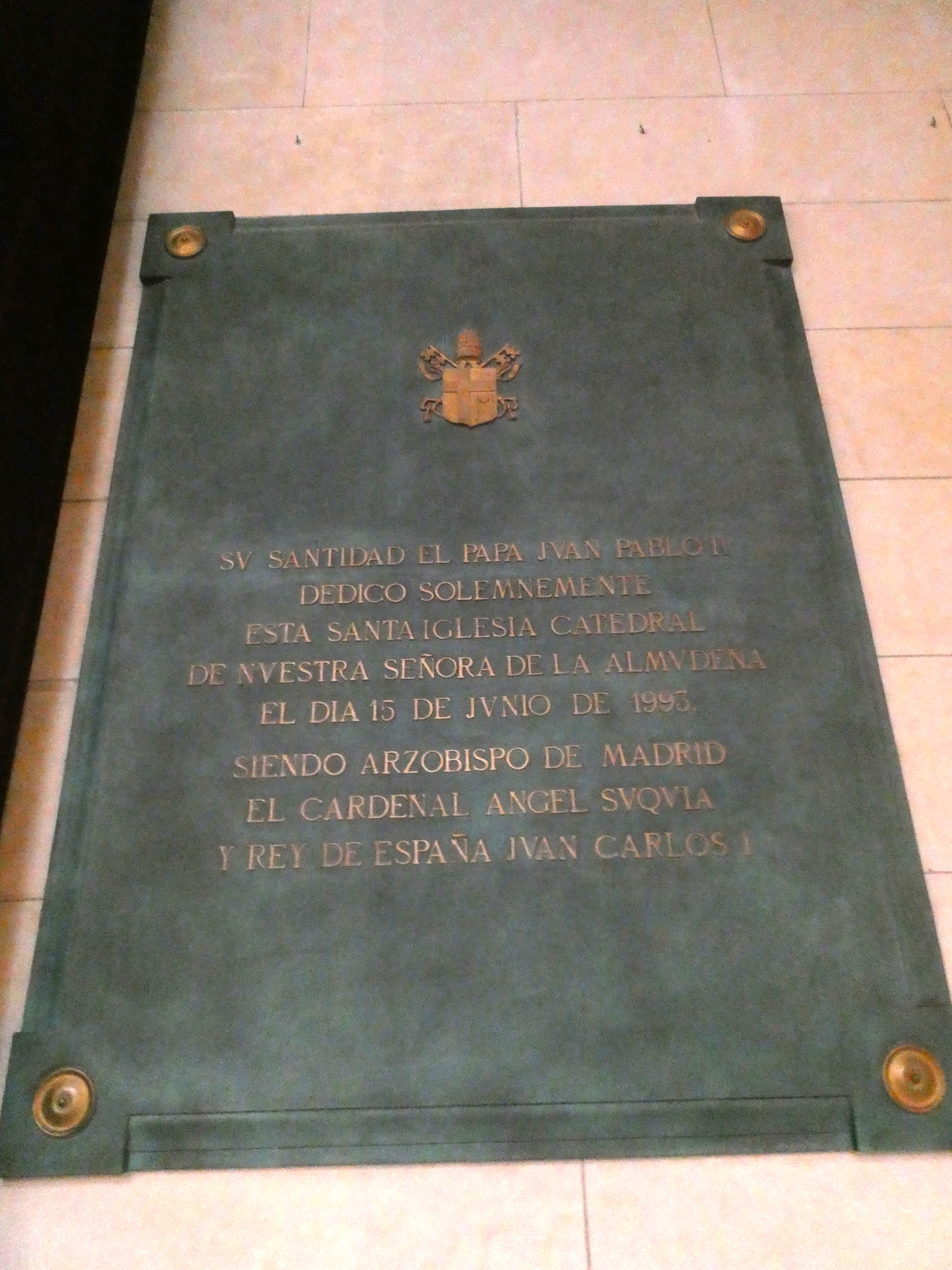
Plaque in the Almudena Cathedral, Madrid, marking a 1993 visit by John Paul II

The Pope's foreign travel programme for 1994 was suspended due to a fall resulting in hip-replacement surgery. Visits to Belgium, the United States, and Lebanon were cancelled as a result. The visits to Belgium and the United States took place in 1995, while the visit to Lebanon was delayed until 1997.

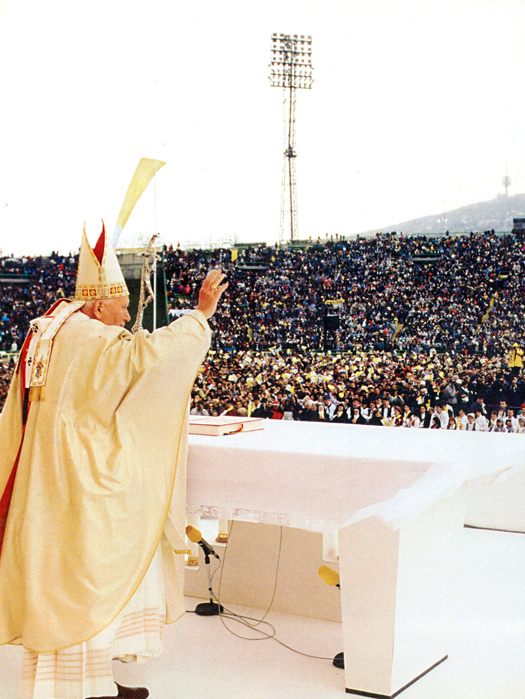
Pastoral visit of Pope John Paul II to Bosnia and Herzegovina

There was a plot to assassinate the Pope during his visit to Manila in January 1995, as part of Operation Bojinka, a mass terrorist attack that was developed by Al-Qaeda members Ramzi Yousef and Khalid Sheik Mohammed. A suicide bomber dressed as a priest and planned to use the disguise to get closer to the Pope's motorcade so that he could kill the Pope by detonating himself. Before 15 January, the day on which the men were to attack the Pope during his Philippine visit, an apartment fire brought investigators led by Aida Fariscal to Yousef's laptop computer, which had terrorist plans on it, as well as clothes and items that suggested an assassination plot. Yousef was arrested in Pakistan about a month later, but Khalid Sheik Mohammed was not arrested until 2003. During this trip to the Philippines, on 15 January 1995, the Pope offered Mass to an estimated crowd of 4–5 million in Luneta Park, Manila, the largest papal crowd ever. On 19 September 1996, the Pope traveled to Saint-Laurent-sur-Sèvre, France to meditate and pray at the adjacent tombs of Saint Louis de Montfort and Blessed Marie Louise Trichet. On 22 March 1998, during his second visit to Nigeria, he beatified the Nigerian monk Cyprian Michael Iwene Tansi. In 1999, John Paul II made a final trip to the United States, this time celebrating Mass in St. Louis in the Trans World Dome. Over 104,000 people attended the 27 January Mass, making it the biggest indoor gathering in the United States.

Voyage	Date	Nations visited	Cities visited	Notes
45	25–27 January 1990	Cape Verde	Praia	
45	27–28 January 1990	Guinea-Bissau	Bissau	
45	28–29 January 1990	Mali	Bamako	
45	29–30 January 1990	Burkina Faso	Ouagadougou	Second visit to Ouagadougou, then in the Republic of Upper Volta
45	30 January 1990 – 1 February	Chad	N'Djamena	
46	21–22 April 1990	Czechoslovakia	Prague, Bratislava	
47	6–13 May 1990	Mexico	Mexico City, Veracruz, San Juan de los Lagos, Cuernavaca, Durango, Chihuahua, Tuxtla Gutiérrez, Villahermosa, Zacatecas	Second visit to Mexico; Preparations for the celebration of the 500th anniversary of the evangelization of the Americas.
47	13 May 1990	Curaçao	Willemstad	
48	25–27 May 1990	Malta	Valletta, Mellieħa, Gozo, Cottonera, Sliema, Floriana, Rabat	Pilgrimage to the places associated with St. Paul
49	1 September 1990	Malta	Luqa	Stopover
49	1–5 September 1990	Tanzania	Dar es Salaam, Mwanza, Tabora, Moshi	
49	5–7 September 1990	Burundi	Bujumbura	
49	7–9 September 1990	Rwanda	Kigali, Kabgayi	
49	10 September 1990	Ivory Coast	Yamoussoukro	Third visit to Ivory Coast; consecration of the Basilica of Our Lady of Peace of Yamoussoukro
50	10–13 May 1991	Portugal	Lisbon, Ponta Delgada, Funchal, Fátima	Third visit to Portugal; Pilgrimage to Fatima on the 10th anniversary of Ağca's assassination attempt on his life and 74th of the 1917 Marian apparitions there
51	1–9 June 1991	Poland	Koszalin, Rzeszów, Przemyśl, Lubaczów, Kielce, Warsaw, Łomża, Białystok, Olsztyn, Włocławek, Płock	Fourth visit to Poland; Beatification of Józef Sebastian Pelczar, Bolesława Lament and Rafał Chyliński.
52	13–15 August 1991	Poland	Kraków, Wadowice, Częstochowa	Fifth visit to Poland; Beatification of Angela Salawa; Celebration of World Youth Day in Częstochowa in post-Communist, Wałęsa-presidency era Poland
52	16–20 August 1991	Hungary	Budapest, Esztergom, Pécs, Nyíregyháza, Máriapócs, Debrecen, Szombathely	
53	12–21 October 1991	Brazil	Natal, São Luís, Brasília, Goiânia, Cuiabá, Campo Grande, Florianópolis, Vitória, Maceió, Salvador	Second visit to Brazil; Participation of the 12th National Eucharistic Congress
54	19–23 February 1992	Senegal	Dakar, Ziguinchor, Popenguine-Ndayane, Gorée	
54	23–24 February 1992	The Gambia	Banjul	
54	24–25 February 1992	Guinea	Conakry	
55	4–10 June 1992	Angola	Luanda, Huambo, Lubango, Cabinda	500th anniversary of Christianity in Angola
55	6–7 June 1992	São Tomé and Príncipe	São Tomé	
56	9–14 October 1992	Dominican Republic	Santo Domingo	Third visit to Dominican Republic; 4th Latin American Episcopal Conference and the 5th Centenary of the evangelization of Latin America
57	3–5 February 1993	Benin	Cotonou, Parakou	Second visit to Benin
57	5–10 February 1993	Uganda	Gulu, Kampala	
57	10 February 1993	Sudan	Khartoum	
58	25 April 1993	Albania	Tirana, Shkodër	Inauguration of St Stephen Main Cathedral, Holy Mass in Shkodër; Consecrated 4 Bishops of Albania; Speech at Skanderbeg Square in Tirana; Meets Mother Teresa in Tirana
59	12–17 June 1993	Spain	Sevilla, La Rábida Friary, Huelva, Madrid	Fourth visit to Spain; 45th International Eucharistic Congress in Sevilla; 500th anniversary of the evangelization of Latin America; consecration of the Almudena Cathedral.
60	9–11 August 1993	Jamaica	Kingston	
60	11–12 August 1993	Mexico	Mérida, Izamal	Third visit to Mexico
60	12–15 August 1993	United States	Denver, Colorado	Fifth visit to U.S.; Celebration of World Youth Day
61	4–7 September 1993	Lithuania	Vilnius, Kaunas, Šiauliai, Šiluva	600th anniversary of the Baptism of Lithuania and visit to the Hill of Crosses. A painting of Pope John Paul II inside the Church of St. Peter and St. Paul depicting him in Vilnius.
61	8–9 September 1993	Latvia	Riga, Aglona	
61	10 September 1993	Estonia	Tallinn	
62	10–11 September 1994	Croatia	Zagreb	900th anniversary of the Archdiocese of Zagreb
63	12–16 January 1995	Philippines	Manila	Second visit to Philippines; celebration of World Youth Day 1995 in Manila; The second-largest papal gathering in history. 400th anniversary of the establishment of the first ecclesiastical provinces in the Philippines
63	16–18 January 1995	Papua New Guinea	Port Moresby	Second visit to Papua New Guinea; Beatification of Peter To Rot
63	18–20 January 1995	Australia	Sydney	Second visit to Australia; Beatification of Mary MacKillop.
63	20–21 January 1995	Sri Lanka	Colombo	Beatification of. Joseph Vaz.
64	20–21 May 1995	Czech Republic	Prague, Olomouc, Ostrava	Second visit to Czech Republic, previously western part of Czechoslovakia. Canonization of John Sarkander & Zdislava of Lemberk in Olomouc
64	22 May 1995	Poland	Skoczów, Bielsko-Biała, Żywiec	Sixth visit to Poland. Commemoration of John Sarkander, patron saint of Silesia and Moravia
65	3–4 June 1995	Belgium	Brussels	Second visit to Belgium, beatification of Father Damien
66	30 June–3 July 1995	Slovakia	Bratislava, Nitra, Šaštín, Košice, Prešov, Levoča	Second visit to Slovakia, previously eastern part of Czechoslovakia; Canonization of the Martyrs of Košice
67	14–16 September 1995	Cameroon	Yaoundé	Second visit to Cameroon
67	16–18 September 1995	South Africa	Johannesburg	signing of the Post-Synodal Exhortation Ecclesia in Africa
67	18–20 September 1995	Kenya	Nairobi	Third visit to Kenya
68	4–9 October 1995	United States	Newark, East Rutherford, New York City, Yonkers, Baltimore	Sixth visit to U.S. Visited the United Nations on the 50th anniversary of its creation.
69	5–6 February 1996	Guatemala	Guatemala City	Second visit to Guatemala
69	7–8 February 1996	Nicaragua	Managua	Second visit to Nicaragua; closing of the National Eucharistic-Marian congress
69	8 February 1996	El Salvador	San Salvador	Second visit to El Salvador
69	9–10 February 1996	Guatemala	Guatemala City	
69	9–11 February 1996	Venezuela	Maiquetia, Caracas, Guanare	Second visit to Venezuela
70	14 April 1996	Tunisia	Tunis	
71	17–19 May 1996	Slovenia	Ljubljana, Postojna, Maribor	
72	21–23 June 1996	Germany	Lippstadt, Paderborn, Berlin	Third visit to Germany; Beatification of Bernard Lichtenberg and Karl Leisner.
73	6–7 September 1996	Hungary	Budapest, Győr	Second visit to Hungary, 1,000th anniversary of Pannonhalma Archabbey's foundation
74	19–22 September 1996	France	Tours, Saint-Laurent-sur-Sèvre, Sainte-Anne-d'Auray, Reims,	Sixth visit to France; 15th centenary of the Baptism of King Clovis & 16th Centenary of the death of St. Martin of Tours
75	12–13 April 1997	Bosnia and Herzegovina	Sarajevo	
76	25–27 April 1997	Czech Republic	Prague, Hradec Králové	Third visit to Czech Republic, 1,000th anniversary of Adalbert of Prague's martyrdom
77	10–11 May 1997	Lebanon	Beirut, Harissa-Daraoun	signing of the Post-Synodal Exhortation A New Hope for Lebanon
78	31 May–10 June 1997	Poland	Wrocław, Legnica, Gorzów Wielkopolski, Gniezno, Poznań, Gniezno, Kalisz, Częstochowa, Zakopane, Ludźmierz, Kraków, Dukla	Seventh visit to Poland; 46th International Eucharistic Congress in Wrocław, 1,000th anniversary of the death of St. Adalbert of Prague, Beatification of Bernardyna Maria Jabłońska and Maria Karłowska and canonization of Bl. Queen Jadwiga of Anjou
79	21–24 August 1997	France	Paris	Seventh visit to France; Celebration of the 12th World Youth Day and the beatification of Frederic Ozanam
80	2–6 October 1997	Brazil	Rio de Janeiro	Third visit to Brazil; II World Meeting of Families with the Pope
81	21–26 January 1998	Cuba	Havana, Camagüey, Santiago de Cuba, Santa Clara	
82	21–23 March 1998	Nigeria	Abuja	Second visit to Nigeria; celebration of the 100th anniversary of the evangelization of Nigeria and the beatification of Cyprian Iwene Tansi.
83	19 June 1998	Austria	Salzburg, Sankt Pölten, Vienna	Third visit to Austria; beatified Maria Restituta Kafka, Jakob Kern and Anton Maria Schwartz.
84	2–4 October 1998	Croatia	Zagreb, Marija Bistrica, Split	Second visit to Croatia; beatification of Cardinal Aloysius Stepinac
85	22–26 January 1999	Mexico	Mexico City	Fourth visit to Mexico; Closing of the Special Assembly for America of the Synod of Bishops and signing of the Post-Synodal Exhortation Ecclesia in America
85	26–27 January 1999	United States	St. Louis	Seventh visit to U.S.
86	7–9 May 1999	Romania	Bucharest	First papal visit to an Orthodox-majority nation.
87	5–17 June 1999	Poland	Gdańsk, Pelplin, Elbląg, Licheń, Bydgoszcz, Toruń, Ełk, Wigry, Siedlce, Drohiczyn, Warsaw, Sandomierz, Zamość, Łowicz, Sosnowiec, Kraków, Stary Sącz, Wadowice, Gliwice, Częstochowa	Eighth visit to Poland; Closing of the 2nd National Plenary Synod, Beatification of 108 Martyrs of World War II in Warsaw
88	19 September 1999	Slovenia	Maribor	Second visit to Slovenia, beatification of Anton Martin Slomšek
89	6–8 November 1999	India	New Delhi	Second visit to India; signing of the Post-Synodal Apostolic Exhortation Ecclesia in Asia
89	8–9 November 1999	Georgia	Tbilisi, Mtskheta	

=== 2000s ===
In 2000, he became the first modern Catholic pope to visit Egypt, where he met with the Coptic Pope and the Greek Orthodox Patriarch of Alexandria.

In May 2001, the Pope took a pilgrimage that would trace the steps of his co-namesake, Saint Paul, across the Mediterranean, from Greece to Syria to Malta. John Paul II became the first Pope to visit Greece in 1291 years. The visit was controversial, and the Pontiff was met with protests and snubbed by Eastern Orthodox leaders, none of whom met his arrival.

In Athens, the Pope met with Archbishop Christodoulos, the head of the Greek Orthodox Church in Greece. After a private 30 minute meeting, the two spoke publicly. Christodoulos read a list of "13 offences" of the Roman Catholic Church against the Orthodox Church since the Great Schism, including the pillaging of Constantinople by Crusaders in 1204. He also bemoaned the lack of any apology from the Roman Catholic Church, saying that "until now, there has not been heard a single request for pardon" for the "maniacal crusaders of the 13th century".

The Pope responded by saying, "For the occasions past and present, when sons and daughters of the Catholic Church have sinned by action or omission against their Orthodox brothers and sisters, may the Lord grant us forgiveness", to which Christodoulos immediately applauded. John Paul also said that the sacking of Constantinople was a source of "deep regret" for Catholics.

Later, John Paul and Christodoulos met on a spot where Saint Paul had once preached to Athenian Christians. They issued a "common declaration", saying, "We shall do everything in our power, so that the Christian roots of Europe and its Christian soul may be preserved. ... We condemn all recourse to violence, proselytism and fanaticism, in the name of religion." The two leaders then said the Lord's Prayer together, breaking an Orthodox taboo against praying with Catholics.

He was the first Catholic Pope to visit and pray in a Mosque, in Damascus, Syria. He visited the Umayyad Mosque, where John the Baptist is believed to be interred.

In September 2001 amid post-September 11 concerns, he travelled to Kazakhstan, with an audience of largely Muslims, and to Armenia, to participate in the celebration of the 1700 years of Christianity in that nation. The Pope's final visit was to the Marian Shrine of Lourdes in the south of France.

Voyage	Date	Nations visited	Places visited	Notes
90	24–26 February 2000	Egypt	Cairo, Mount Sinai	Great Jubilee pilgrimage to Mount Sinai
91	20–21 March 2000	Jordan	Amman, Mount Nebo, Al-Maghtas	Great Jubilee pilgrimage to the Holy Land
91	21–22 March 2000	Israel	Tel Aviv, Nazareth, Jerusalem, Capernaum	Great Jubilee pilgrimage to the Holy Land
91	21–22 March 2000	Palestinian National Authority	Bethlehem, Dheisheh	Great Jubilee pilgrimage to the Holy Land
92	12–13 May 2000	Portugal	Fátima	Fourth visit to Portugal. Great Jubilee pilgrimage to the Marian shrine in Fátima.
93	4–5 May 2001	Greece	Athens	Great Jubilee pilgrimage in the footsteps of St. Paul
93	5–8 May 2001	Syria	Damascus, Quneitra	Great Jubilee pilgrimage in the footsteps of St. Paul
93	8–9 May 2001	Malta	Gudja, Floriana, Ħamrun	Third visit to Malta; Great Jubilee pilgrimage to the footsteps of St. Paul, beatification.
94	23–27 June 2001	Ukraine	Kyiv, Lviv	Beatification of Józef Bilczewski, Zygmunt Gorazdowski and 27 New Martyrs of the Ukrainian Greek Catholic Church.
95	22–25 September 2001	Kazakhstan	Astana	
95	25–27 September 2001	Armenia	Yerevan, Etchmiadzin	To celebrate 1,700 years of Christianity of Armenia's state religion and honor victims of the Armenian genocide
96	22–23 May 2002	Azerbaijan	Baku	
96	23–26 May 2002	Bulgaria	Sofia, Rila Monastery, Plovdiv	
97	23–29 July 2002	Canada	Toronto	Third visit to Canada; Celebration of the 17th World Youth Day 2002 in Toronto.
97	29–30 July 2002	Guatemala	Guatemala City	Third visit to Guatemala
97	30 July–2 August 2002	Mexico	Mexico City	Fifth visit to Mexico; Canonization of Juan Diego
98	16–19 August 2002	Poland	Kraków	Ninth, and last visit to his native Poland; Dedication of the Shrine of Divine Mercy in Kraków; Beatification and 400th anniversary of the Dedication of the Basilica of Our Lady of the Angels in Kalwaria Zebrzydowska
99	3–4 May 2003	Spain	Madrid	Fifth visit to Spain; Canonization in Madrid
100	5–9 June 2003	Croatia	Rijeka, Dubrovnik, Osijek, Zadar	Third visit to Croatia; beatification of Marija Petković
101	22 June 2003	Bosnia and Herzegovina	Banja Luka	Second visit to Bosnia and Herzegovina; beatification of Ivan Merz
102	11–14 September 2003	Slovakia	Bratislava, Trnava, Banská Bystrica, Rožňava	Third visit to Slovakia
103	5–6 June 2004	Switzerland	Bern	Fourth visit to Switzerland to attend a rally of Swiss Catholic youth.
104	14–15 August 2004	France	Tarbes, Lourdes	Eighth and last visit to France, as well as his last papal visit, to mark the 150th anniversary of the promulgation of the dogma of the Immaculate Conception.

== Travels in Italy ==
=== 1970s ===
- 29 October 1978: Sanctuary of the Mentorella
- 5 November 1978: Assisi
- 18 May 1979: Montecassino
- 14 August 1979: Albano Laziale
- 26 August 1979: Canale d'Agordo, Malga Ciapela, Marmolada di Rocca, Belluno and Treviso
- 1 September 1979: Nettuno
- 3 September 1979: Albano Laziale
- 8 September 1979: Loreto and Ancona
- 9 September 1979: Grottaferrata
- 13 September 1979: Pomezia
- 21 October 1979: Pompeii

=== 1980s ===
- 23 March 1980: Cascia and Norcia
- 13 April 1980: Turin
- 30 August 1980: Assergi, Traforo del Gran Sasso and L'Aquila
- 7 September 1980: Velletri
- 8 September 1980: Frascati
- 14 September 1980: Siena
- 20 September 1980: Montecassino and Cassino
- 28 September 1980: Subiaco
- 5 October 1980: Galatina and Otranto
- 25 November 1980: Potenza, Balvano and Avellino
- 19 March 1981: Terni
- 26 April 1981: Orio al Serio, Sotto il Monte and Bergamo
- 22 November 1981: Collevalenza and Todi
- 12 March 1982: Assisi
- 19 March 1982: Rosignano Solvay, Livorno and Sanctuary of Montenero
- 18 April 1982: Bologna and San Lazzaro di Savena
- 29 August 1982: Rimini
- 5 September 1982: Serra Sant'Abbondio and Fonte Avellana
- 12 September 1982: Rubano and Padua
- 19 September 1982: Albano Laziale
- 29 September 1982: Ghedi, Concesio and Brescia
- 20–21 November 1982: Ponte Valle, Belice and Palermo
- 2 January 1983: Rieti and Greccio
- 19 March 1983: San Salvo, Termoli and Pescara
- 20–22 May 1983: Milan, Desio, Seregno, Venegono, Monza and Sesto San Giovanni
- 18 August 1983: Palestrina
- 3 September 1983: Anzio
- 26 February 1984: Bari and Bitonto
- 27 May 1984: Viterbo
- 16–17 July 1984: Mount Adamello
- 12 August 1984: Fano
- 19 August 1984: Rocca di Papa
- 2 September 1984: Alatri
- 5–7 October 1984: Lamezia Terme, Serra San Bruno, Paola, Catanzaro, Cosenza, Crotone and Reggio di Calabria
- 2–4 November 1984: Milan, Varese, Pavia, Varallo and Arona
- 29 December 1984: Grottaferrata
- 24 March 1985: Fucino and Avezzano
- 11 April 1985: Loreto
- 26 May 1985: Salerno
- 15–17 June 1985: Vittorio Veneto, Riese Pio X, Treviso, Venice and Mestre
- 30 June 1985: Atri, Isola del Gran Sasso and Teramo
- 14 September 1985: Albano Laziale
- 21–22 September 1985: Genoa and Shrine of Nostra Signora della Guardia
- 18–20 October 1985: Cagliari, Iglesias, Oristano, Nuoro and Sassari
- 19 March 1986: Prato
- 8–11 May 1986: Forlì, Cesena, Imola, Faenza, Brisighella, Ravenna and Cervia
- 9 August 1986: Rocca di Mezzo and Piani di Pezza
- 31 August 1986: Anagni
- 6–7 September 1986: Aosta, Courmayeur and Mont Blanc
- 14 September 1986: Aprilia
- 18–19 October 1986: Fiesole and Florence
- 26 October 1986: Perugia
- 27 October 1986: Assisi In this trip, the pope has an encounter with leaders of several religions in a prayer for the peace.
- 19 March 1987: Civitavecchia
- 23–25 May 1987: San Giovanni Rotondo, Monte Sant'Angelo, Manfredonia, Foggia, San Severo, Lucera, Troia, Bovino, Ascoli Satriano and Cerignola
- 8–14 July 1987: Lorenzago di Cadore, San Pietro di Cadore and Fortogna
- 2 September 1987: Rocca di Papa
- 5 September 1987: Albano Laziale
- 7 September 1987: Grottaferrata
- 16–17 April 1988: Verona
- 1 May 1988: Castel Sant'Elia, Civita Castellana and Nepi
- 3–7 June 1988: Carpi, Modena, Fiorano, Fidenza, Piacenza, Castel San Giovanni, Reggio Emilia, Parma and Bologna
- 11–12 June 1988: Messina, Tindari and Reggio di Calabria
- 13–22 July 1988: Lorenzago di Cadore, Mount Adamello, Col Cumano, Sanctuary of Pietralba and Tesero
- 19 August 1988: Albano Laziale
- 21 August 1988: Rocca di Papa
- 2–4 September 1988: Turin, Castelnuovo Don Bosco, Colle Don Bosco and Chieri
- 30 December 1988: Fermo and Porto San Giorgio
- 21 May 1989: Grosseto
- 25 June 1989: Gaeta, Sanctuary of the Madonna della Civita and Formia
- 12–21 July 1989: Introd, Oropa, Pollone, Quart and Turin
- 18 September 1989: Orte and Trevignano Romano
- 22–24 September 1989: Pisa, Cecina, Volterra and Lucca
- 28–29 October 1989: Taranto and Martina Franca

=== 1990s ===
- 18–19 March 1990: Ivrea, San Benigno Canavese, Scarmagno and Chivasso
- 17 June 1990: Orvieto
- 2 July 1990: Benevento
- 11–20 July 1990: Introd, Barmasc and Mont Blanc
- 20 September 1990: Albano Laziale
- 22–23 September 1990: Ferrara, Pomposa, Comacchio and Argenta
- 14 October 1990: Genoa
- 9–13 November: Naples, Torre del Greco, Pozzuoli, Nocera Inferiore, Pagani, Aversa, Trentola-Ducenta, Casapesenna and Lusciano
- 18–19 March 1991: San Severino Marche, Camerino, Fabriano and Matelica
- 27–28 April 1991: Matera, Pisticci and Potenza
- 22–23 June 1991: Mantua and Castiglione delle Stiviere
- 10–19 July 1991: Introd, Susa, Sacra di San Michele and Breuil-Cervinia
- 2 September 1991: Carpineto Romano
- 7–8 September 1991: Vicenza
- 29 September 1991: Le Ferriere
- 19 March 1992: Sorrento and Castellammare di Stabia
- 30 April – 3 May 1992: Aquileia, Pordenone, San Vito al Tagliamento, Concordia Sagittaria, Trieste, Gorizia, Gemona del Friuli, Udine and Redipuglia War Memorial
- 23–24 May 1992: Nola, Caserta, Santa Maria Capua Vetere and Capua
- 19–21 June 1992: Caravaggio, Crema, Lodi and Cremona
- 17 August – 2 September 1992: Lorenzago di Cadore and Domegge di Cadore
- 9–10 January 1993: Assisi
- 19 March 1993: Magliano Sabina, Vescovio, Poggio Mirteto, Abbey of Farfa and Monterotondo
- 22 April 1993: Genazzano
- 8–10 May 1993: Trapani, Erice, Mazara del Vallo, Agrigento and Caltanissetta
- 23 May 1993: Cortona
- 19–20 June 1993: Macerata, Foligno and Gran Sasso
- 7–16 July 1993: Lorenzago di Cadore and Santo Stefano di Cadore
- 17 September 1993: Sanctuary of La Verna and Camaldoli
- 25–26 September 1993: Asti and Isola d'Asti
- 17–27 August 1994: Introd
- 17–18 September 1994: Lecce
- 4–5 November 1994: Catania and Siracusa
- 10 December 1994: Loreto
- 19 March 1995: Campobasso, Monte Vairano, Castelpetroso and Agnone
- 29–30 April 1995: Trento
- 12–22 1995: Introd
- 9–10 September 1995: Loreto
- 23 November 1995: Palermo
- 30 March 1996: Colle Val d'Elsa
- 4–5 May 1996: Como
- 10–23 July 1996: Lorenzago di Cadore and Pieve di Cadore
- 14 August 1996: Albano Laziale
- 9–19 August 1997: Introd
- 6 September 1997: Marino
- 27–28 September 1997: Bologna
- 3 January 1998: Annifo, Cesi and Assisi
- 23–24 May 1998: Vercelli and Turin
- 8–21 July: 1998: Lorenzago di Cadore and Borno
- 18–20 September: Chiavari and Brescia
- 30 May 1999: Ancona
- 7–20 July 1999: Introd and Quart
- 4 September 1999: Pontecagnano-Faiano and Salerno

=== 2000s ===
- 10–22 July 2000: Introd
- 9–20 July 2001: Introd
- 16 September 2001: Frosinone
- 24 January 2002: Assisi
- 5 May 2002: Ischia
- 24 July 2003: Gran Sasso
- 7 October 2003: Pompeii
- 5–17 July 2004: Introd
- 5 September 2004: Loreto

== See also ==
- List of pastoral visits of Pope Paul VI
- List of pastoral visits of Pope Benedict XVI
- List of pastoral visits of Pope Francis
- List of pastoral visits of Pope Leo XIV
- List of meetings between the pope and the president of the United States
- Papal travel
- State visit
