= Introd Castle =

Castle in Aosta Valley, Italy

- Castello di Introd (Italian); Château d'Introd (French)
- Introd, Aosta Valley, Italy
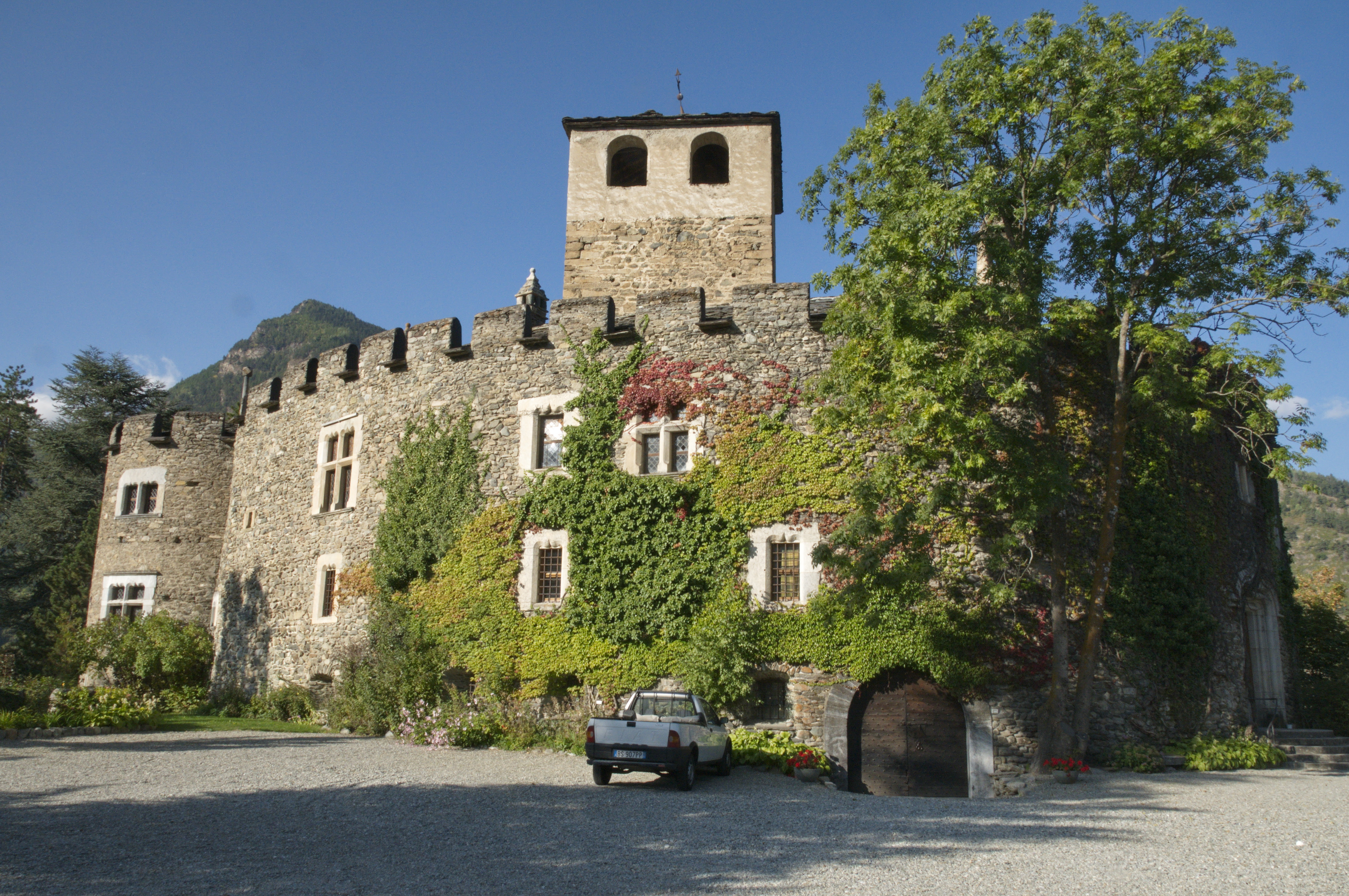
- Introd Castle in 2009

Site information
- Type: Castle

Location
- Coordinates: 45°41′28.82″N 7°11′11.05″E

Introd Castle (Italian: Castello di Introd, French: Château d'Introd) is a castle located in Introd, Aosta Valley, Italy.

== History ==
The castle dates back to the 12th century, when it was built as a relatively simple structure consisting of a square keep surrounded by a moderately thick curtain wall. It is mentioned in the documents of the castellany of Châtel-Argent in 1244. To improve its defenses, Pierre Sarriod ordered an expansion in 1260, transforming it into a true fortress. Further modifications in the 15th century gave the castle a more rounded shape.

The castle suffered two major incidents in modern times that necessitated further restorations: a fire in the second half of the 19th century and another at the beginning of the 20th century. In the latter case, the owner, Cavalier Gonella, commissioned the direction of the restoration work in 1910 to architect Jean Chevalley, resulting in the castle's current appearance.

The property was bought by the Aosta Valley region in 2023 for a price of 3.65 million euros.

== Description ==
The main hall is adorned with a fresco featuring a series of framed scenes near the ceiling, each depicting a different tree.

== Gallery ==
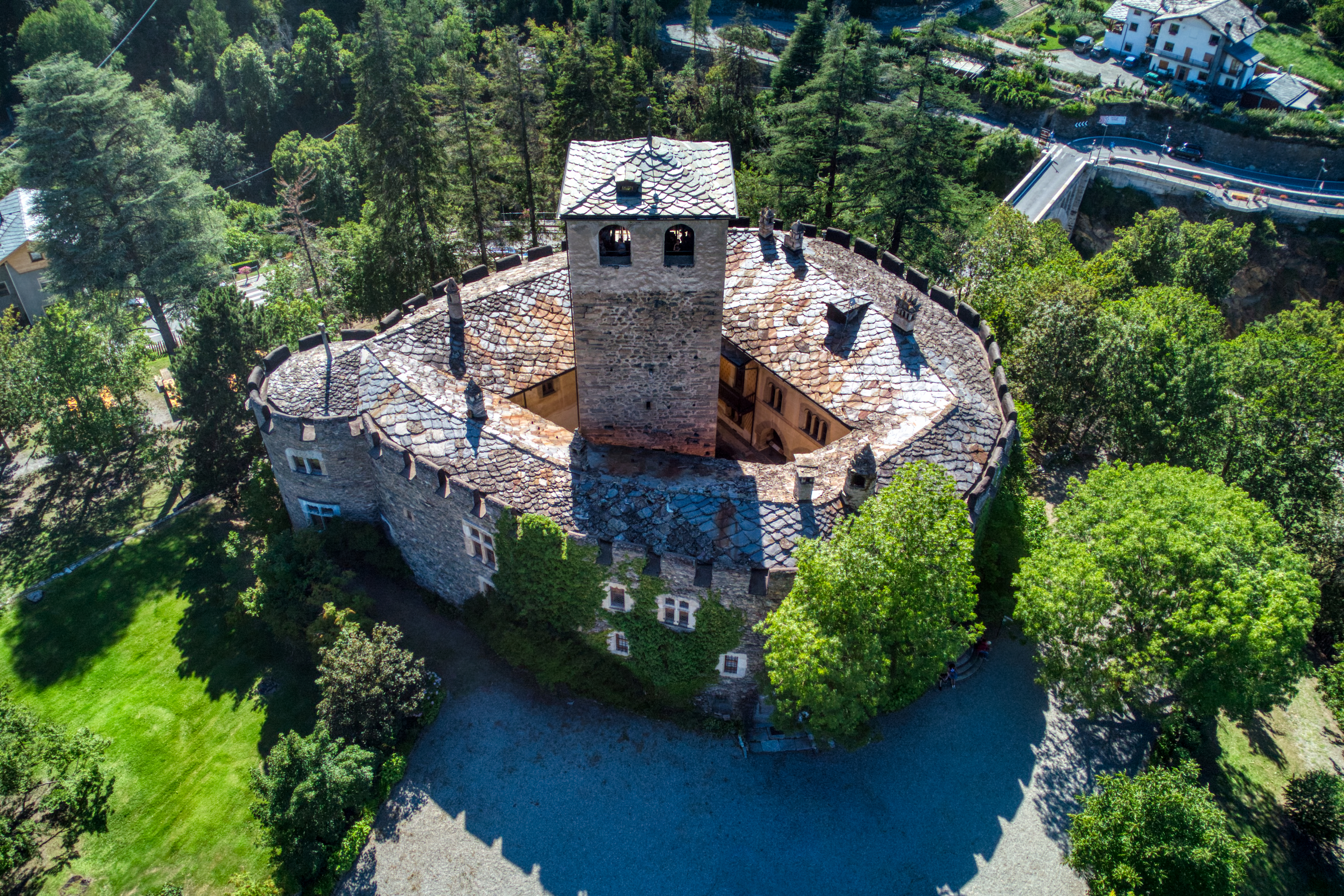

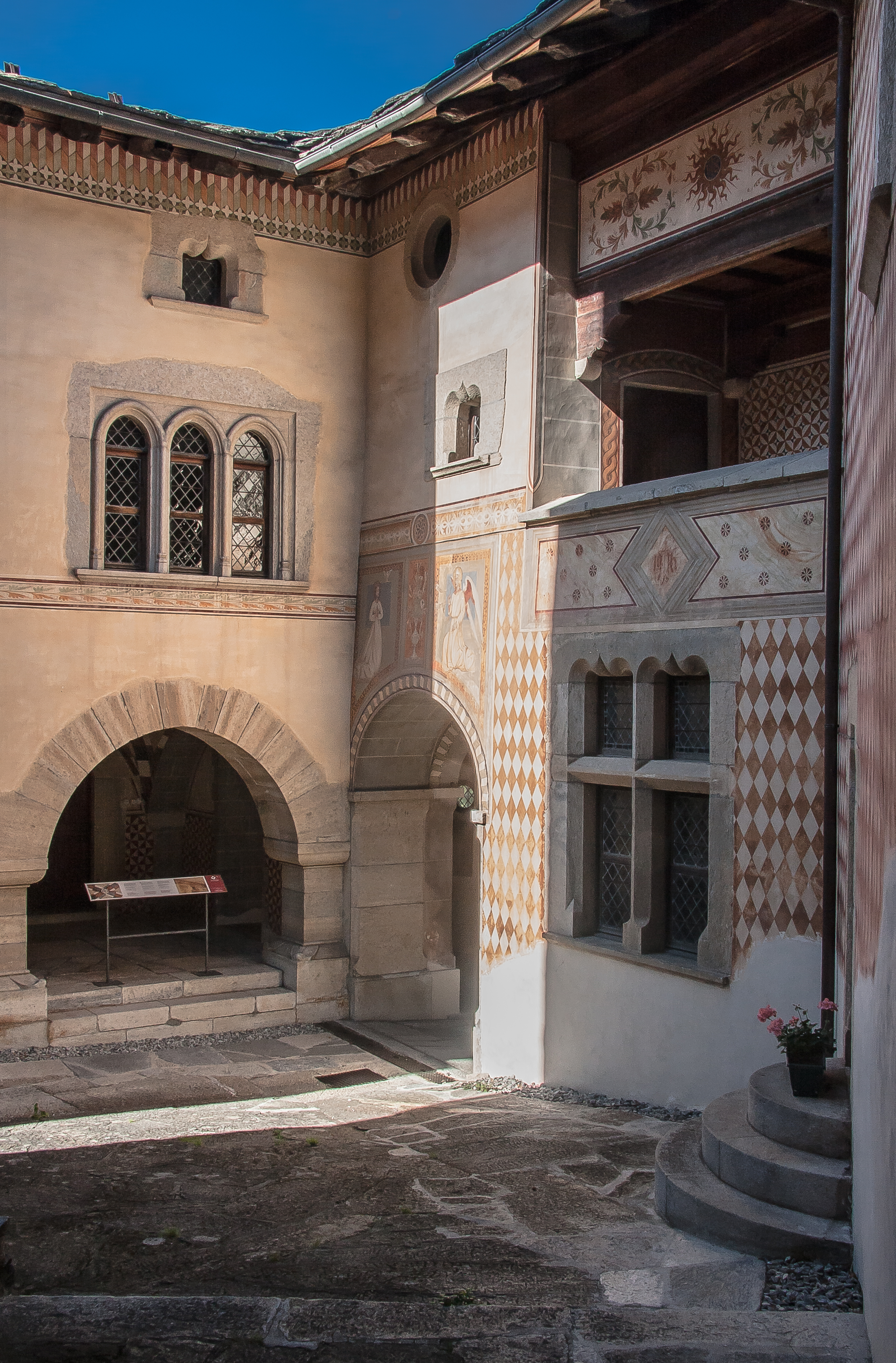

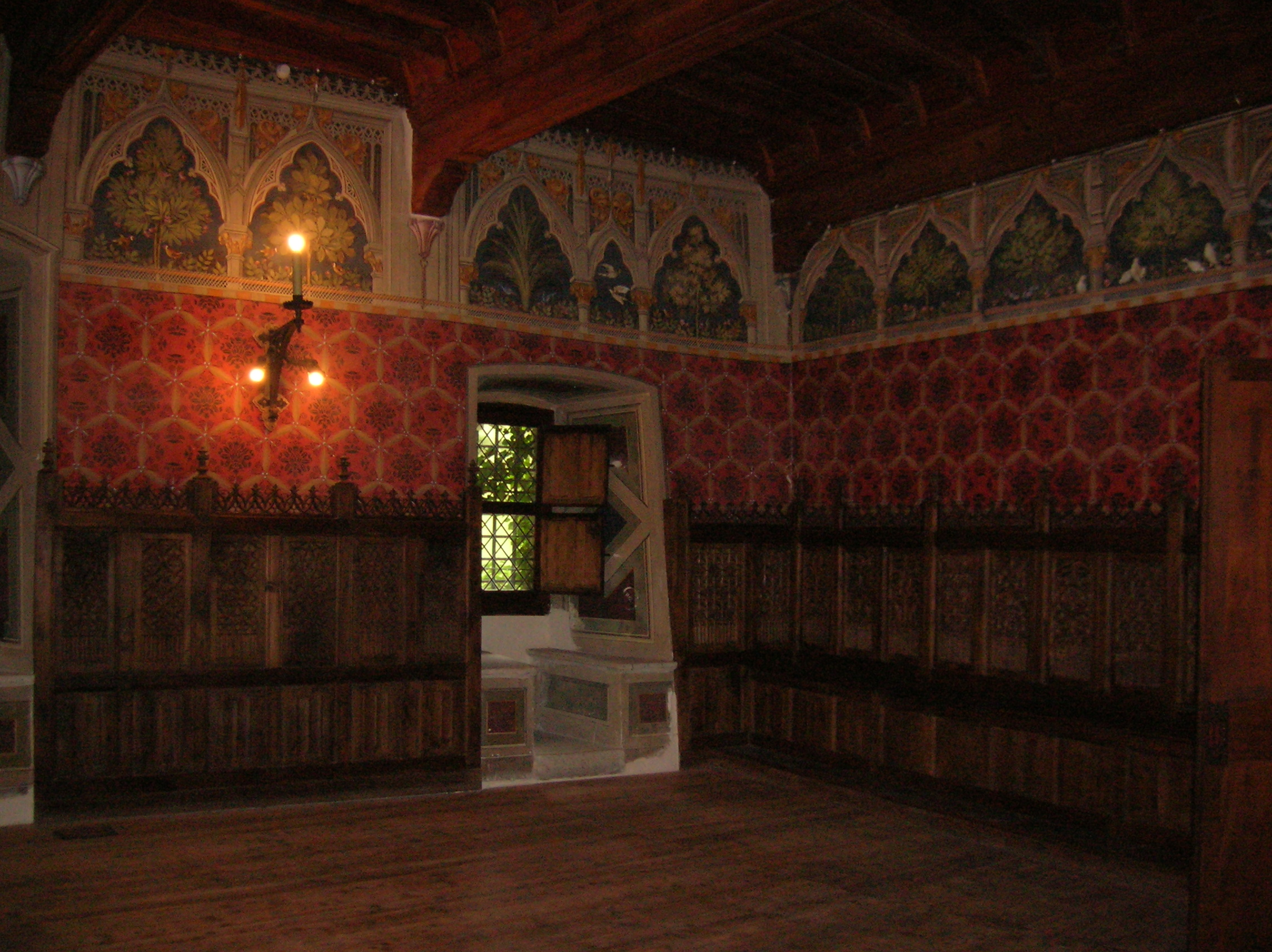
