= Udine Courthouse =

Building in Udine, Italy

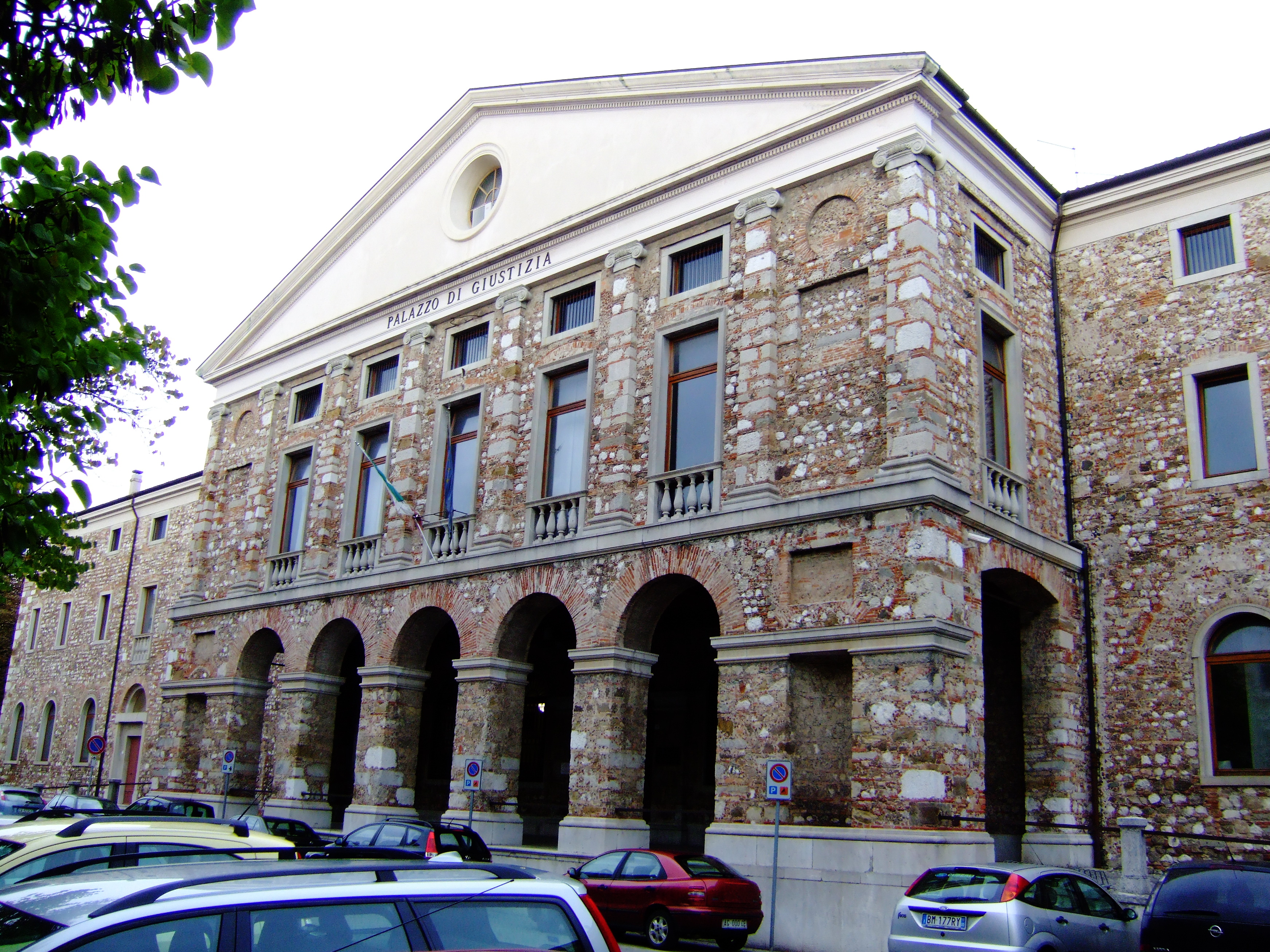
- Interactive map of the Udine Courthouse area

General information
- Location: Udine, Friuli-Venezia Giulia, Italy
- Coordinates: 46°3′36.08″N 13°14′8.31″E
- Construction started: 1782
- Opening: 1833

Design and construction
- Architects: Pietro Bianchi, Gian Antonio Selva, Giuseppe Segusini

The Udine Courthouse (Palazzo di Giustizia, or Palazzo del Tribunale) is a building located on Largo Ospedale Vecchio in Udine, Italy.

== History ==
In the 14th century, the Brotherhood of Santa Maria della Misericordia dei Battuti established a facility to provide aid to the poor and the sick. In the following century, the hospital became an important institution, and in the 16th century, it merged with several other local hospitals. As a result of this merger, it was renamed Ospedale Maggiore Santa Maria della Misericordia dei Battuti.

In 1782, the Archbishop of Udine, Gian Girolamo Gradenigo, promoted the construction of a larger hospital to accommodate the increasing number of patients. The foundation stone was laid near the cloister of the church of St. Francis. The new hospital was designed by architect Pietro Bianchi, and later modified by Gian Antonio Selva. However, construction was delayed due to the French occupation and the hospital opened only around 1833, with a project revised by Giuseppe Segusini.

Over time, the hospital became inadequate for the growing city population. In 1924, a new hospital center was begun, and the old building was eventually abandoned, briefly serving as the Natural History Museum. In 1929, the construction of the fourth wing of the inner courtyard was completed. During World War II, the building was repurposed as a military barracks.

In the 1960s, the eastern part of the complex was controversially demolished, erasing one of the few examples of a four-courtyard hospital. In 1978, architect Gino Valle led the development of new design proposals, culminating in a final plan by Domenico Bortolotti and engineer Gianni della Marina. This plan transformed the old hospital site into the current courthouse, integrating the restored historic building with a new structure on Via Morpurgo.
