= Annea Clivana =

In classical Celtic polytheism, Annea Clivana was the name given to a goddess or female spirit worshipped in Canale in Veneto in the territory of the Cenomani Celts in Italy. She was identified with the Roman goddess Juno and was portrayed as being in the company of a genius loci. Because of the philological correspondence between her name and that of Áine, it is tempting to see the theonyms Áine and Annea as cognates.
