= Giuseppe Zais =

Italian painter

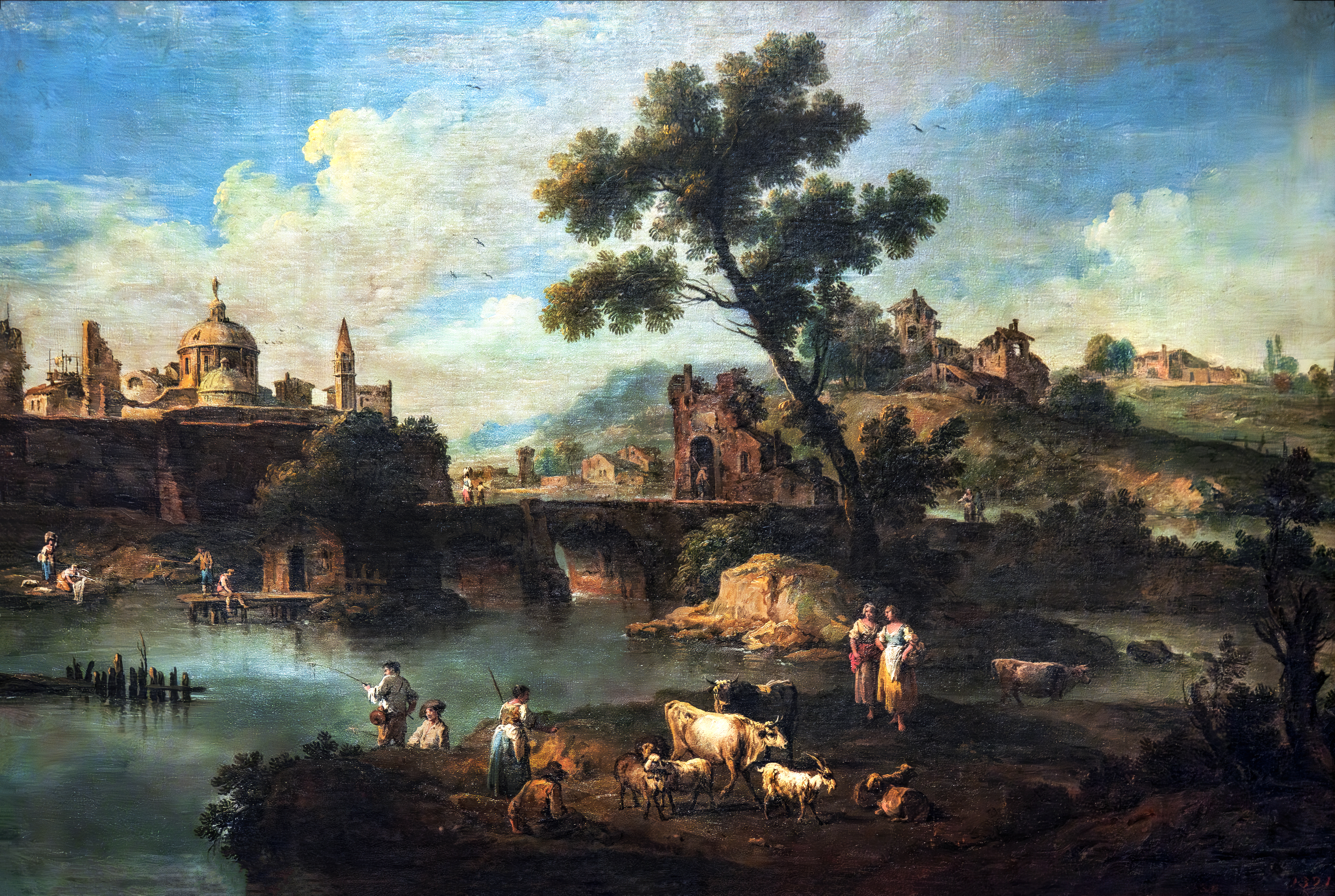
Landscape with River and Bridge, c. 1730. Gallerie dell'Accademia, Venice.

Giuseppe Zais (Italian pronunciation: [dʒuˈzɛppe dˈdzais]; March 22, 1709 – October 29, 1784) was an Italian painter of landscapes (vedutisti) who painted mostly in Venice. He was born in Forno di Canale.

He was influenced in his vedute by Marco Ricci and later Francesco Zuccarelli, who helped train him. He is best known for frescoes in Villa Pisani in Stra. While he had been a member of the Academy of Painters in Venice from 1774, he died in poverty at Treviso.

== Sources ==
- Wittkower, Rudolf (1993). Art and Architecture Italy, 1600-1750. 1980. Penguin Books Ltd. p. 501.
