= Canale d'Agordo =

Canale d'Agordo Canal
- Comune
- Comune di Canale d'Agordo
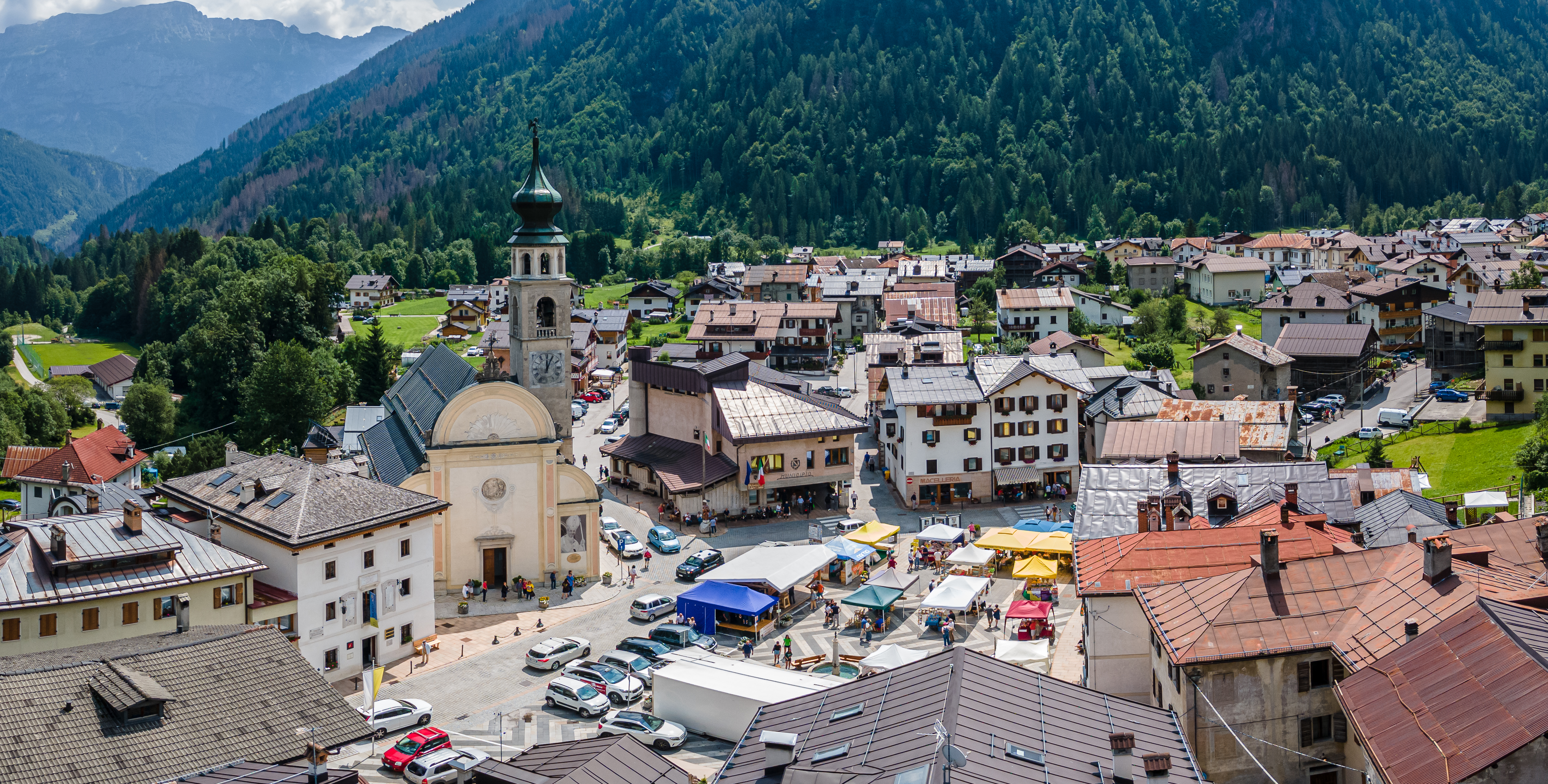
- view of Canale d'Agordo

- Coat of arms

- Location within Italy Location within Veneto
- Coordinates: 46°21′N 11°55′E
- Country: Italy
- Region: Veneto
- Province: Belluno (BL)
- Frazioni: Fregona, Feder, Garés, Carfon, Pisoliva, Casate, Val, La Šota, Campion, Pàlafachina, La Mora, Tegosa, Colmean, Gares

Government
  - Mayor: Massimo Murer

Area
  - Total: 46 km^{2} (18 sq mi)
- Elevation: 976 m (3,202 ft)

Population (2001)
  - Total: 1,236
  - Density: 27/km^{2} (70/sq mi)
- Demonym: Canalini
- Time zone: UTC+1 (CET)
  - Summer (DST): UTC+2 (CEST)
- Postal code: 32020
- Dialing code: 0437
- Patron saint: St. John the Baptist
- Saint day: June 24
- Website: Home town

Canale d'Agordo (known as Forno di Canale until 1964; Ladin: Canal, German: Augartnerkanal) is a town and comune in the province of Belluno, in the region of Veneto, northern Italy. It has 1,230 inhabitants. Pope John Paul I (born Albino Luciani) and the landscape painter Giuseppe Zais were born in Canale d'Agordo. It has a Museum dedicated to Pope John Paul I called the Pope Luciani Museum.

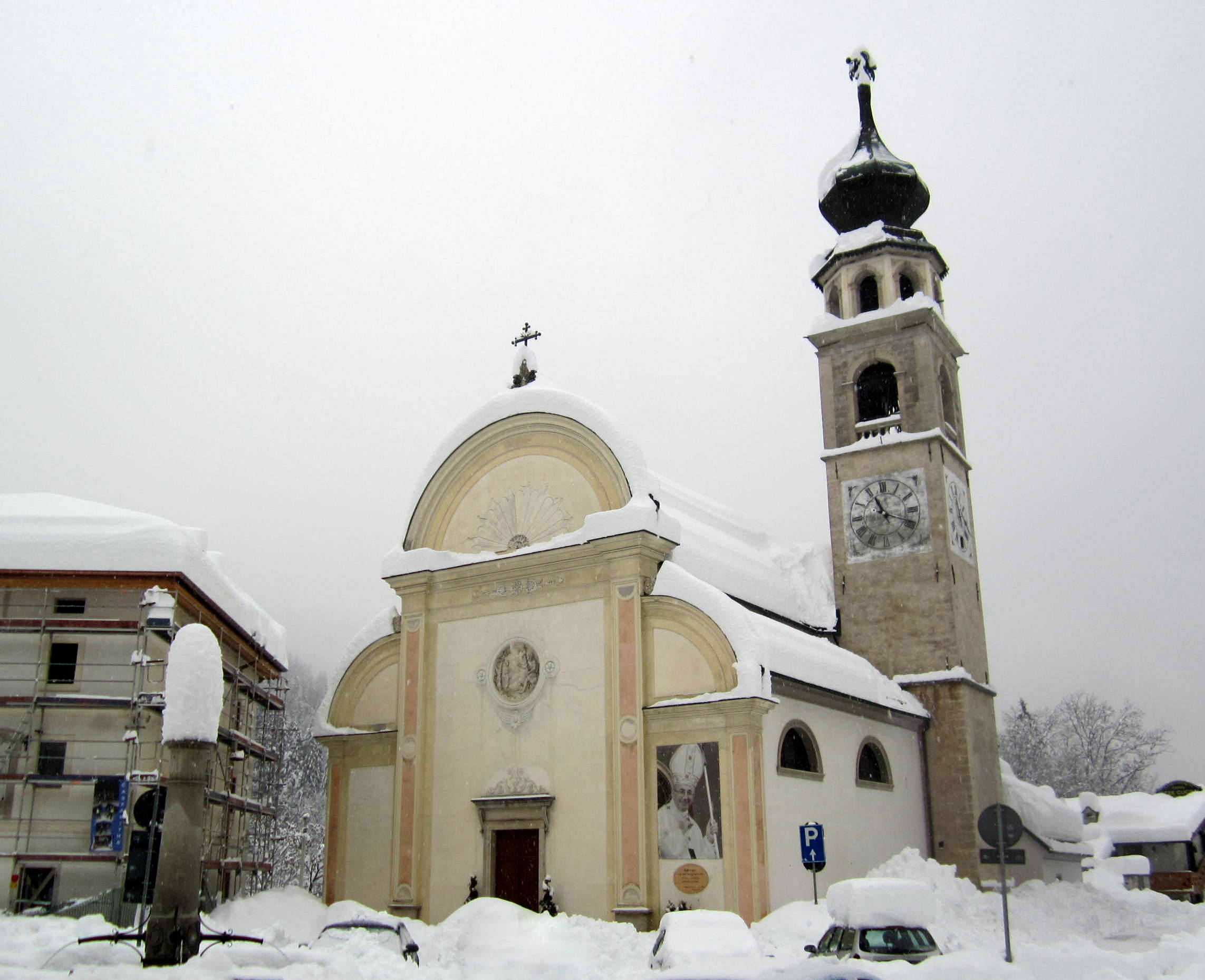
Parish church designed by Giuseppe Segusini

== Demographic evolution ==
Historical population

Year	Pop.	±%
1861	?	—
1871	1,641	—
1881	1,717	+4.6%
1901	1,856	+8.1%
1911	2,033	+9.5%

Year	Pop.	±%
1921	2,023	−0.5%
1931	1,782	−11.9%
1936	1,653	−7.2%
1951	1,818	+10.0%
1961	1,786	−1.8%

Year	Pop.	±%
1971	1,684	−5.7%
1981	1,472	−12.6%
1991	1,285	−12.7%
2001	1,236	−3.8%

Source: Data from ISTAT

== Notable people ==
- Pope John Paul I, born Albino Luciani
- Giuseppe Zais, painter
- Franco Manfroi, ski mountaineer and cross-country skier

== Twin towns ==
Canale d'Agordo is twinned with:

- Lacenas in France (since 2006)
- Wadowice in Poland (since 2009)
- Massaranduba, Santa Catarina in Brazil (since 2011)

== See also ==
- Annea Clivana
