= Introd =

Introd Euntroù (Valdôtain)
- Comune
- Comune di Introd; Commune d'Introd
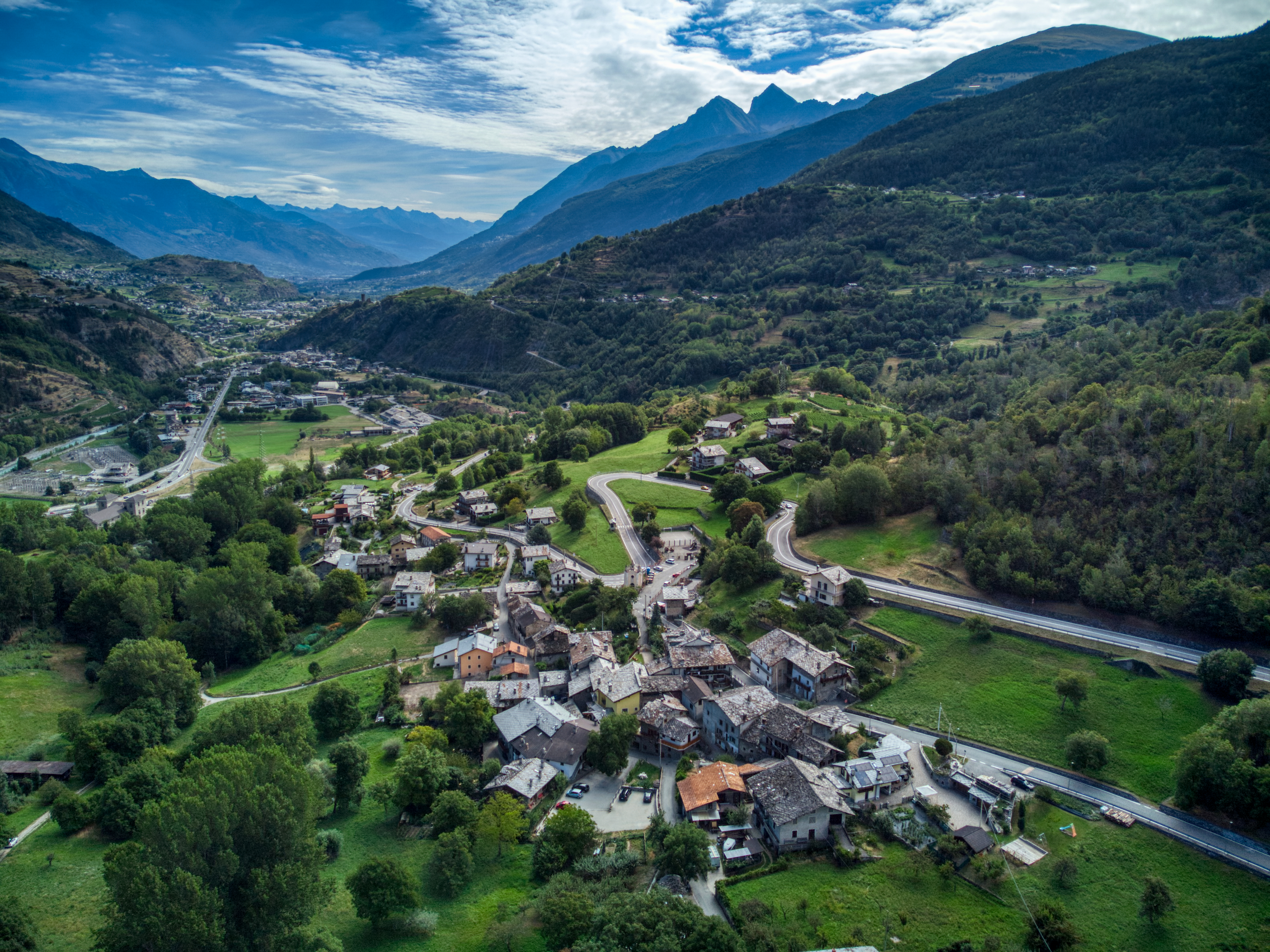

- Coat of arms

- Location within Italy Location within Aosta Valley
- Coordinates: 45°41′23.88″N 7°11′15.44″E
- Country: Italy
- Region: Aosta Valley
- Province: none
- Frazioni: Le Bioley, Le Buillet, Chevrère, Crée, Delliod, Junod, Les Combes, Le Norat, Plan-d'Introd, Tâche, Les Villes-Dessous, Les Villes-Dessus

Area
  - Total: 20 km^{2} (7.7 sq mi)
- Elevation: 880 m (2,890 ft)

Population (31 December 2022)
  - Total: 648
  - Density: 32/km^{2} (84/sq mi)
- Demonym: Introleins
- Time zone: UTC+1 (CET)
  - Summer (DST): UTC+2 (CEST)
- Postal code: 11010
- Dialing code: 0165
- Patron saint: Saint Paul
- Saint day: 25 January
- Website: Official website

Introd (French: [ɛ̃tʁo]; Valdôtain: Euntroù) is a town and comune in the Aosta Valley region of north-western Italy.

The town is home to Introd Castle.

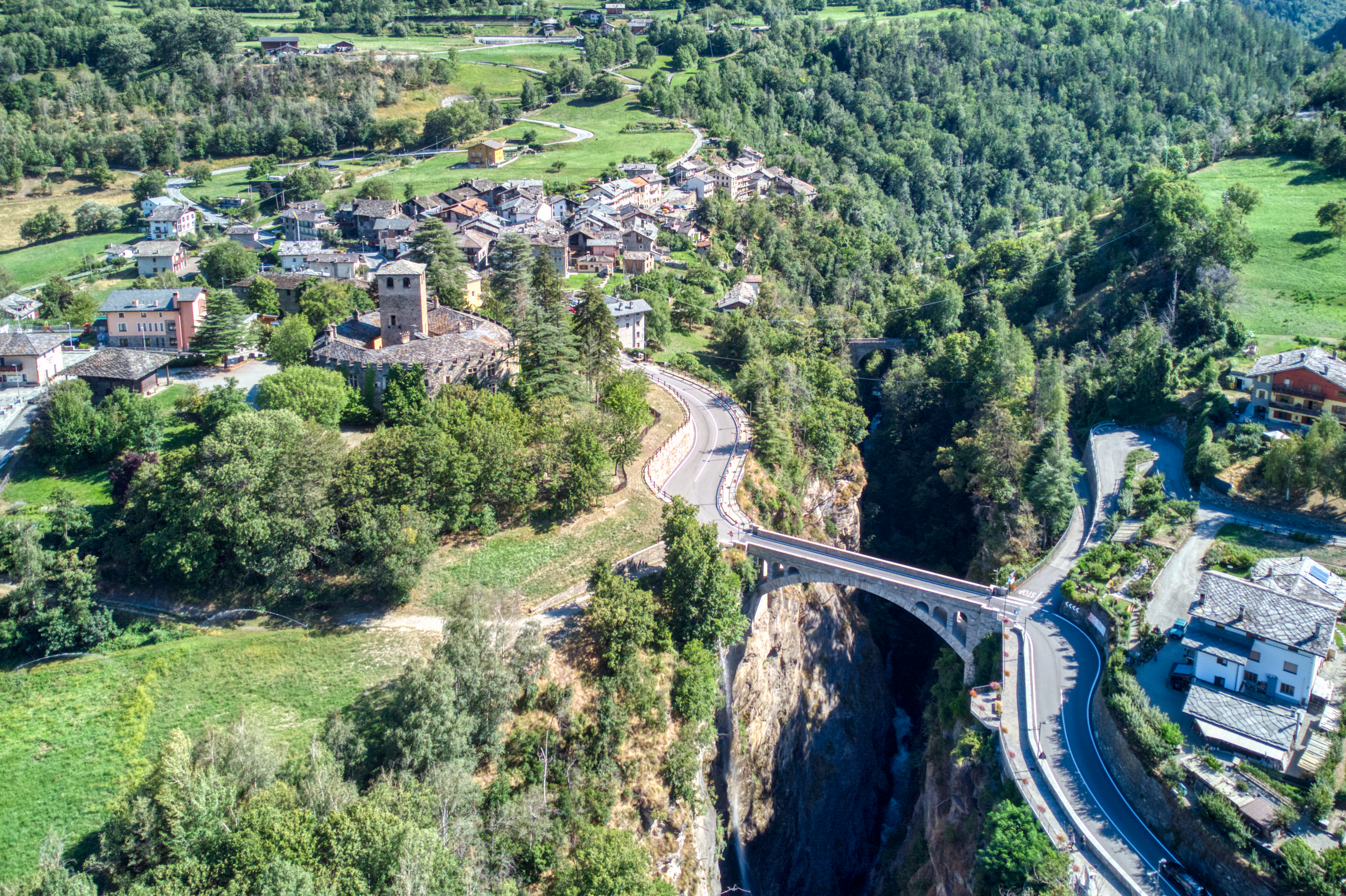
Introd Castle and the new bridge (French: Pont neuf)
