= Giuseppe Segusini =

Italian Architect

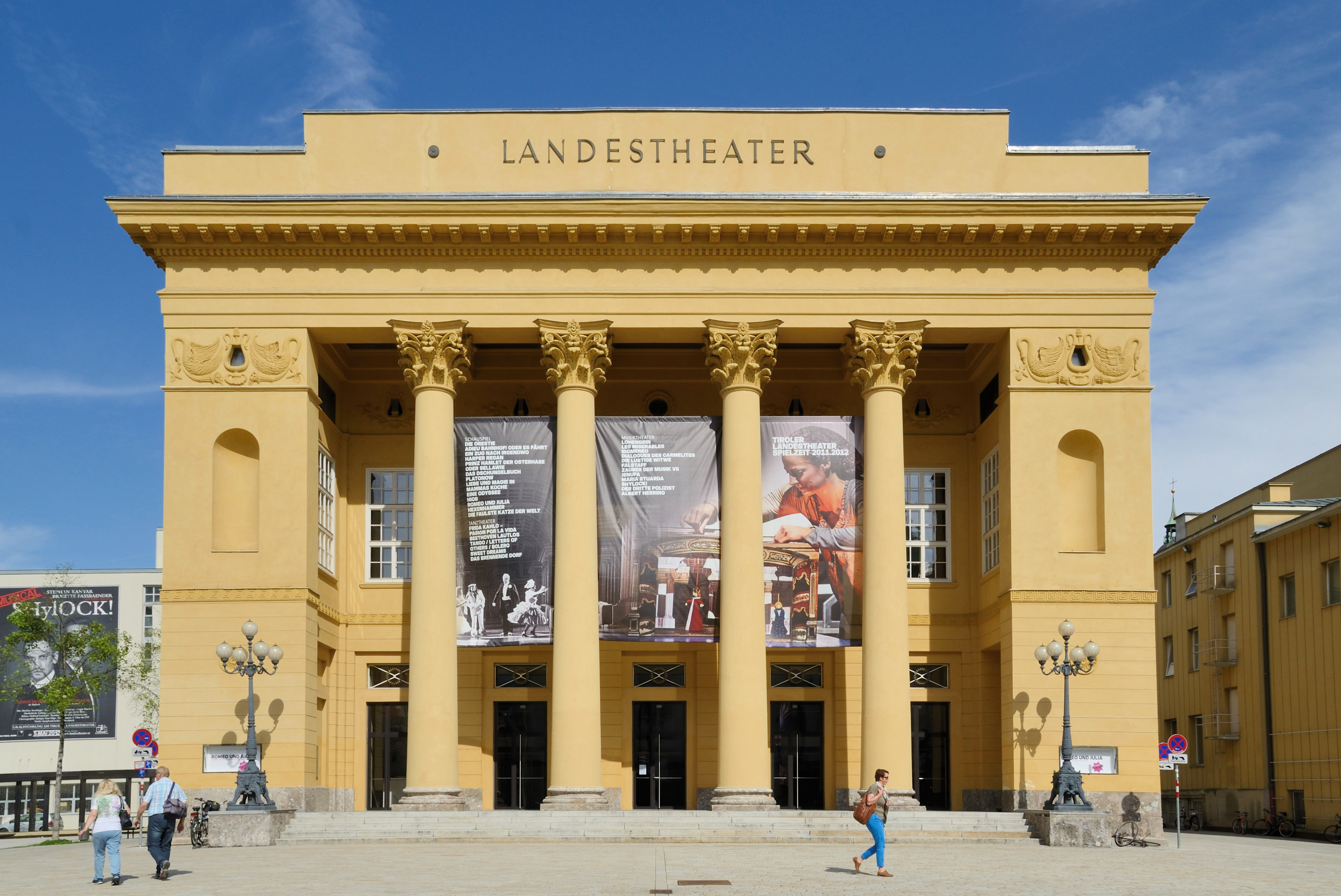
- Landestheater, Innsbruck, 1844–6
- Born: 15 July 1801; Feltre, Venetian Province
- Died: 29 March 1876 (aged 74); Belluno, Kingdom of Lombardy–Venetia
- Education: Accademia di Belle Arti di Venezia
- Occupation: Architect
- Movement: Neoclassicism
- Buildings: Tyrolean State Theatre

Giuseppe Segusini (15 July 1801 – 29 March 1876) was an Italian neoclassical architect.

== Biography ==
=== Early life and education ===
He was born in Feltre, one of twenty children to a poor family, and the only to survive to adulthood. As a child, he worked as a carpenter and baker.The local count Fedele Norcen took an interest in his education, and he entered the school of design directed by Agostino Occofer. In 1821 he began to attend courses at the Accademia di Belle Arti di Venezia, where he won the prizes for architectural composition and perspective in 1825 and 1826.

A highly competent architect, Segusini used many styles and exploited a range of cultural traditions throughout his career. Because he worked principally away from major artistic centres, he depended considerably on his own small library, which included textbooks on surveying methods and instruments; architectural treatises of the Renaissance and more recent and indispensable texts in Italian translation; and collections of 17th- and 18th-century plates. There were books on the debate concerning the façade of Santa Maria del Fiore, Florence, on theatres, as well as on plates of the Fenice theatre in Venice, on the history of art (Franz Theodor Kugler: Handbuch der Kunstgeschichte, Berlin, 1841) and architecture, and on art criticism (Arte e artisti by Pietro Selvatico Estense).

His contact with figures of the contemporary cultural world was also limited, essentially amounting to friendship with such local artists as Amico Ricci, the painter Giovanni de Min and Valentino Besarel (who informed him about the international exhibitions of Paris in 1867 and Vienna in 1873). He became a member of a number of academies, however, including the Accademia di Belle Arti, Venice, in 1836.

=== Career ===
In his work in the Veneto (above all in the Bellunese) and in Friuli, Segusini used an eclectic range of styles, effectively developing those that he had studied in Venice. He designed centrally planned buildings (the Neoclassical temples of Mel, 1836, and San Lucano in Auronzo, 1841), in which he resorted to trite variations of the Pantheon, Rome; buildings in the Gothic Revival manner that are Venetian in character (Palazzo Guarnieri, Feltre, 1835; Palazzo Municipale, Feltre, 1836); and he later adapted his decorative detail according to the designs of Friedrich Hoffstadt, whose book Principi dello Stile Gotico, cavati dai monumenti del medioevo ad uso degli artisti ed operai. Traduzione dal francese del prof. Francesco Lazzari (Venice, 1853) was sent to him in 1857.

He designed the theatre in Belluno (1834), his first building in the Neoclassical style, as well as theatres in Innsbruck (Tyrolean State Theatre, 1844–6) and Serravalle (1843), and the churches at Dosoledo (1839) and Campolongo (1843). The critic Selvatico Estense had already identified an academic and formalistic coldness in Segusini’s Neoclassical buildings. In his palaces, designed according to the traditional Venetian ground-plan, he applied Giant orders on tall pedestals to the façades of the Palazzo Cappellari della Colomba (1835) in Belluno, or smooth rustication and low-relief modelling, as at the Palazzo Zugni (1839) in Feltre. Other Neoclassical designs include the seminary of Feltre (1847) and a building incorporating shops in Crespano (1851).

He even flirted with the Egyptian style (in a rural building for the Colle family in Belluno, 1838, and in the country house for the counts of Caratti of Udine, 1843) and the Arab style (a factory in Crespano,1871). Occasionally, Segusini drew on the style of Cinquecento Veneto architecture, for example at the church (1845) at Codroipo and the hospital (1842) in Udine. Segusini’s attachment above all to the Gothic and Neoclassical styles represents the search for a spatial unity that sought to adapt the ‘new’ buildings to their urban context. The Palazzo Municipale, Belluno, is a Gothic Revival building of Venetian type, in which the panels from the demolished Palazzo del Consiglio dei Nobili could be incorporated. The Palazzo Guarnieri (1835) in Feltre and the hospital (1848) in Serravalle were attempts at preserving something of the character of the buildings that formerly occupied the sites of the new constructions.

Segusini’s professional activity also included urban planning schemes, of which only one was realized: the Piazza Maggiore (1868) in Feltre.

== Gallery ==
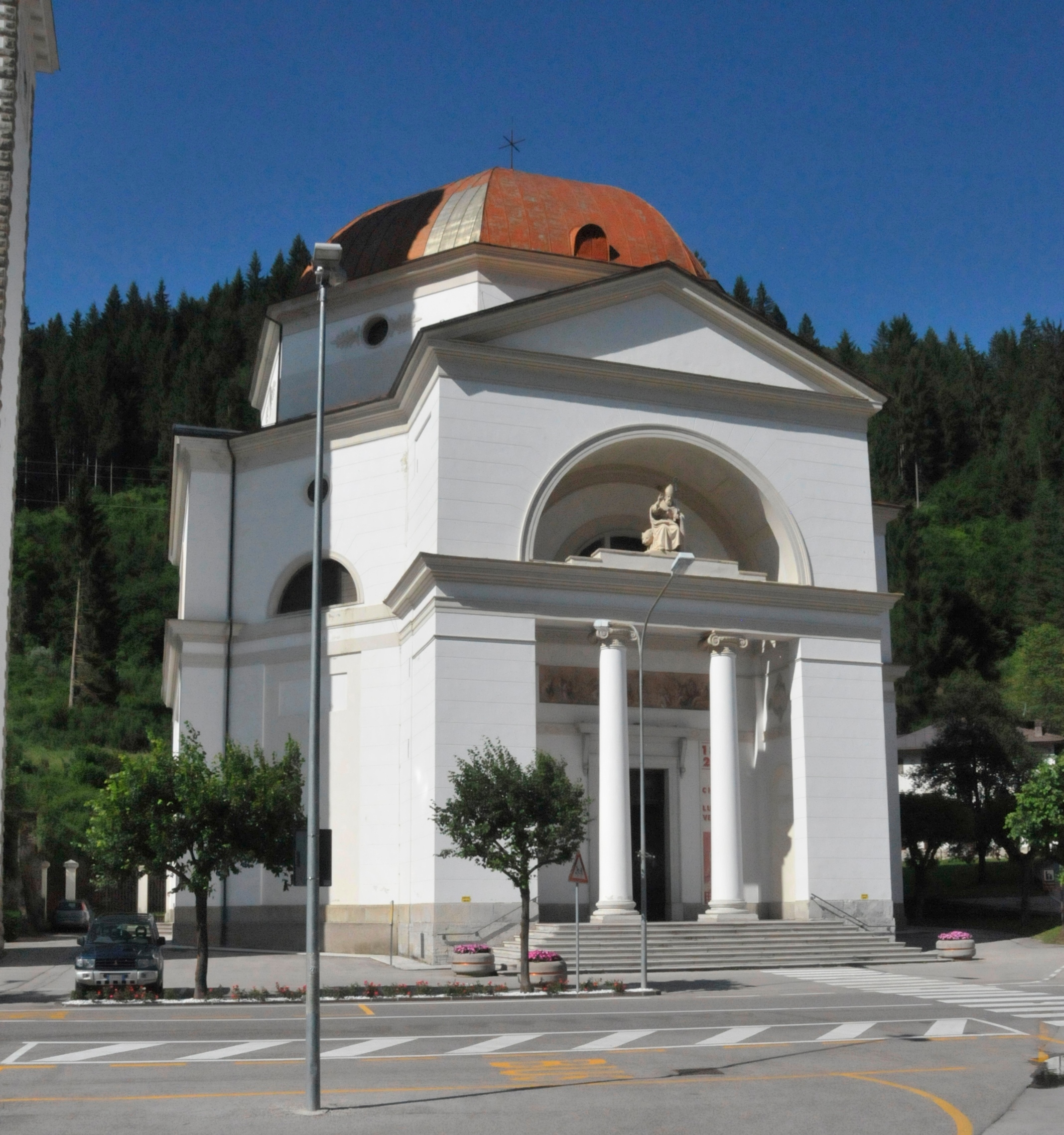
San Lucano, Auronzo di Cadore, 1841

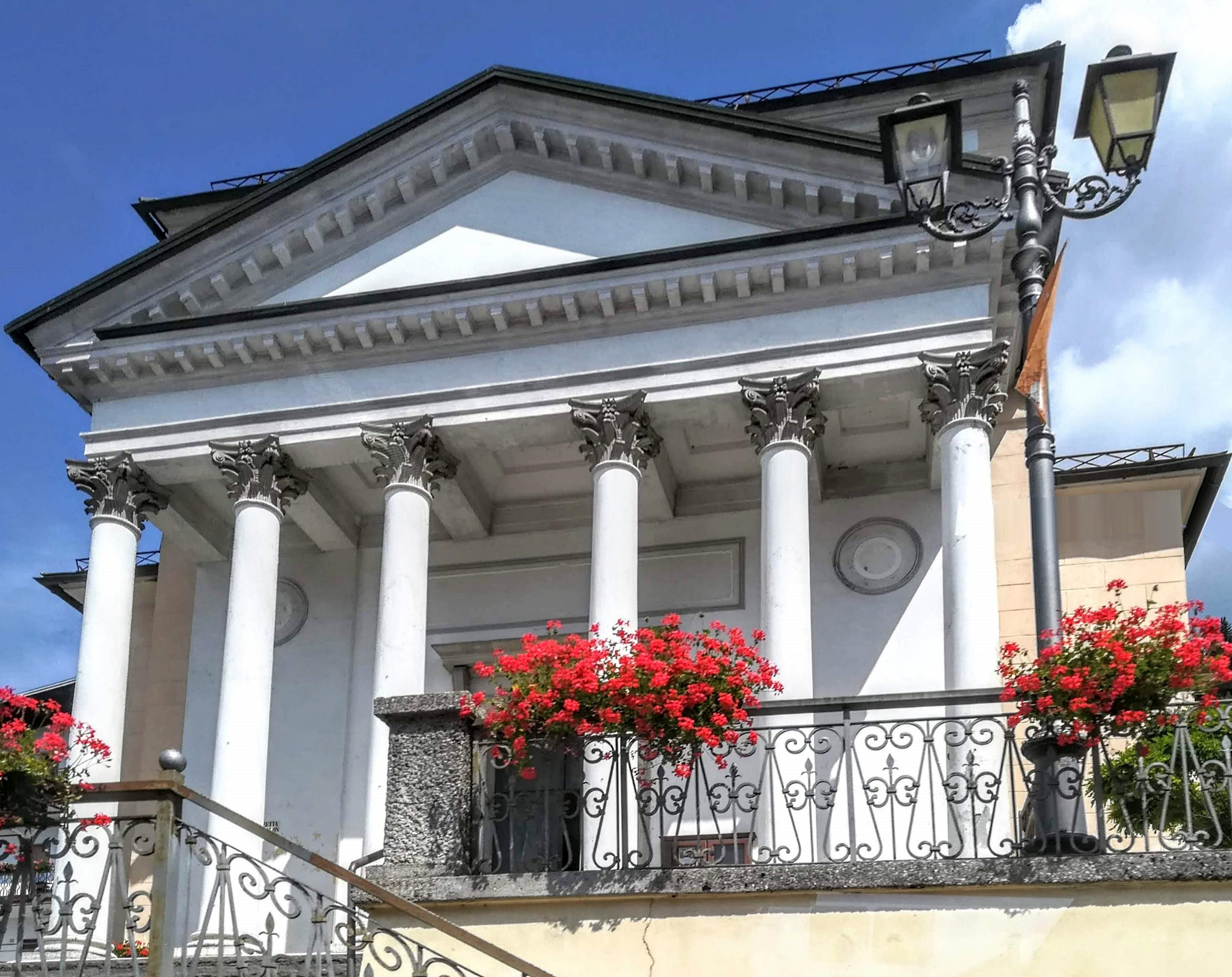
Santi Rocco e Osvaldo, Dosoledo, 1839

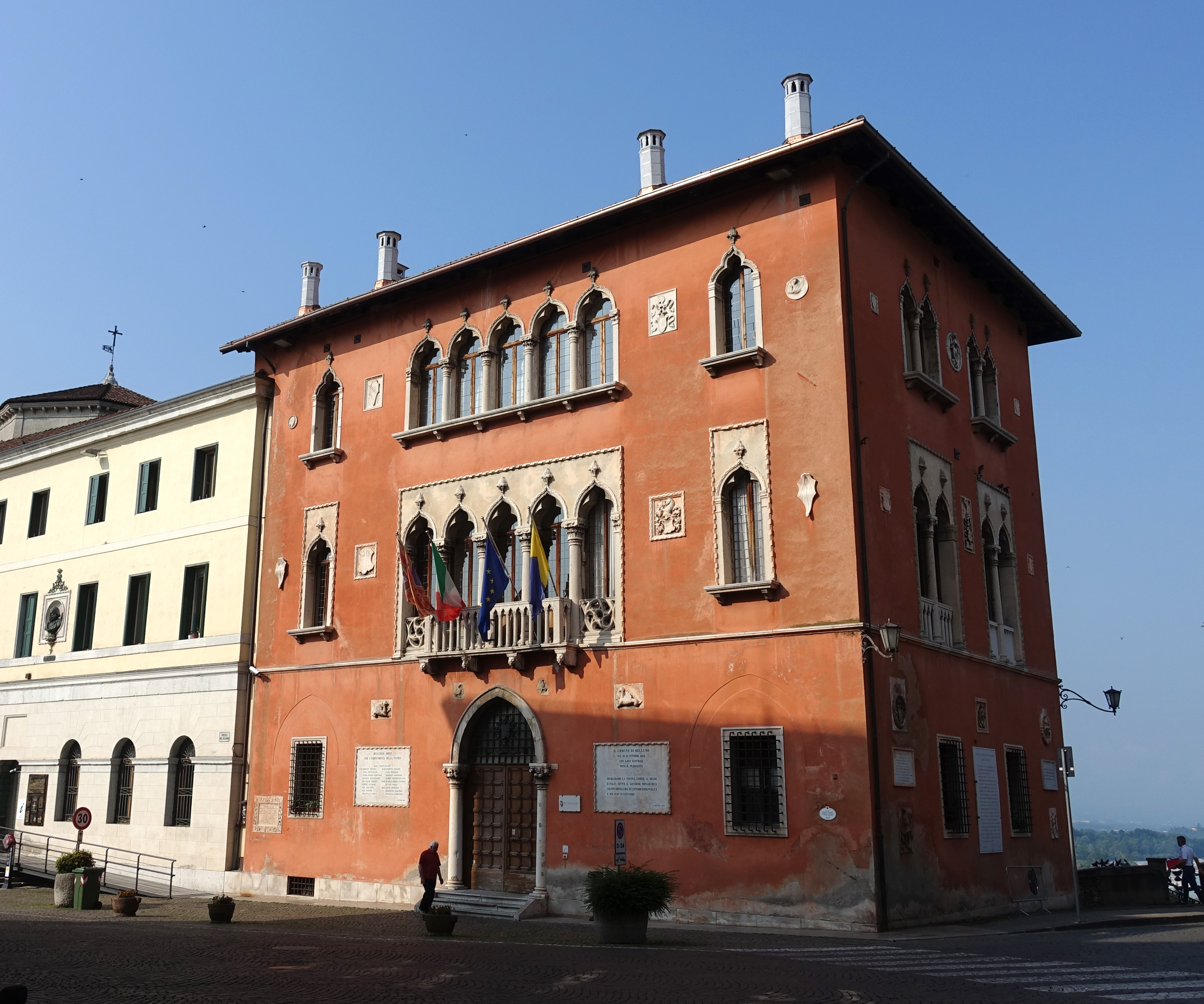
Palazzo Municipale, Belluno, 1834-1835

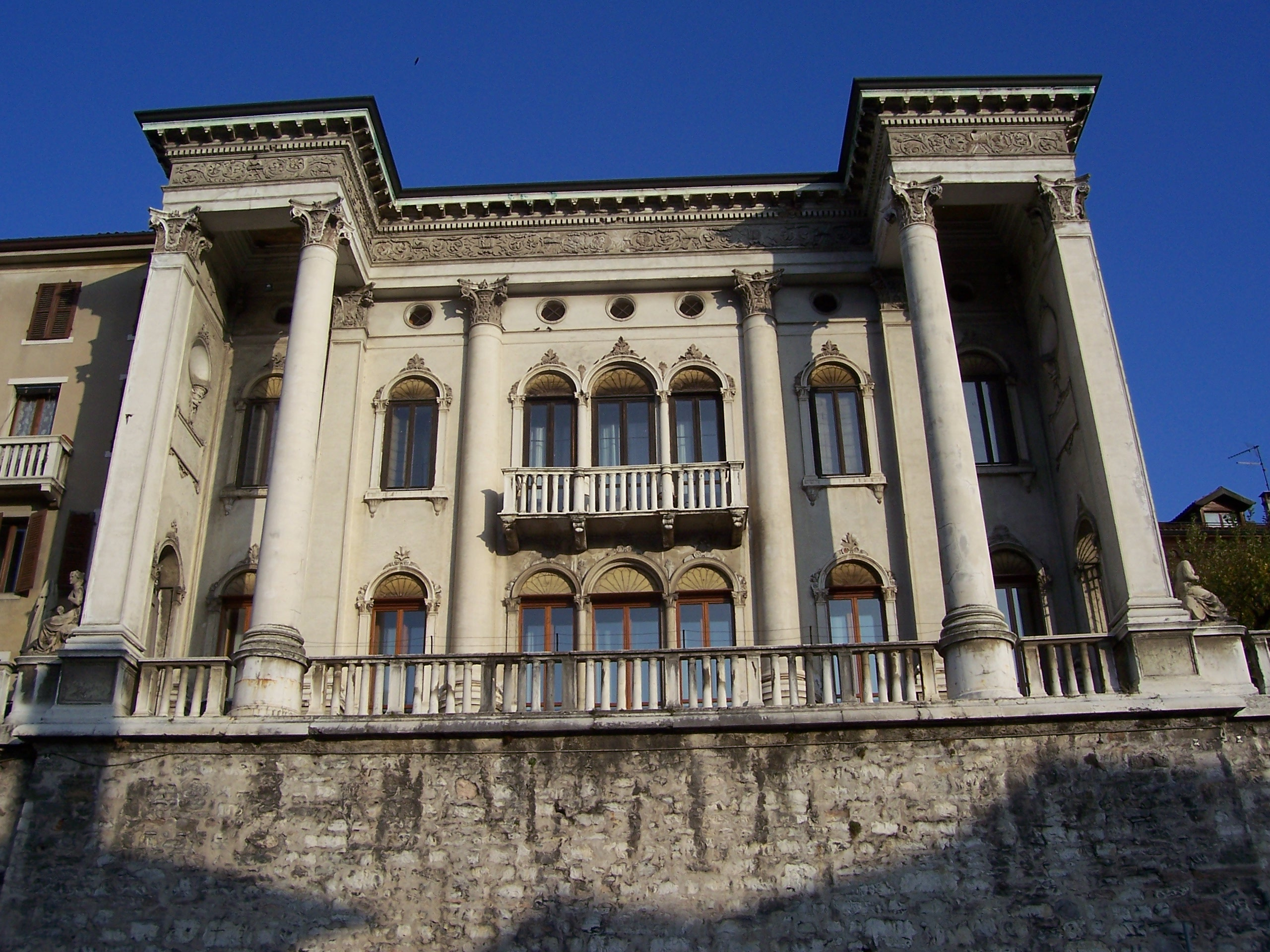
Palazzo Berton, Feltre

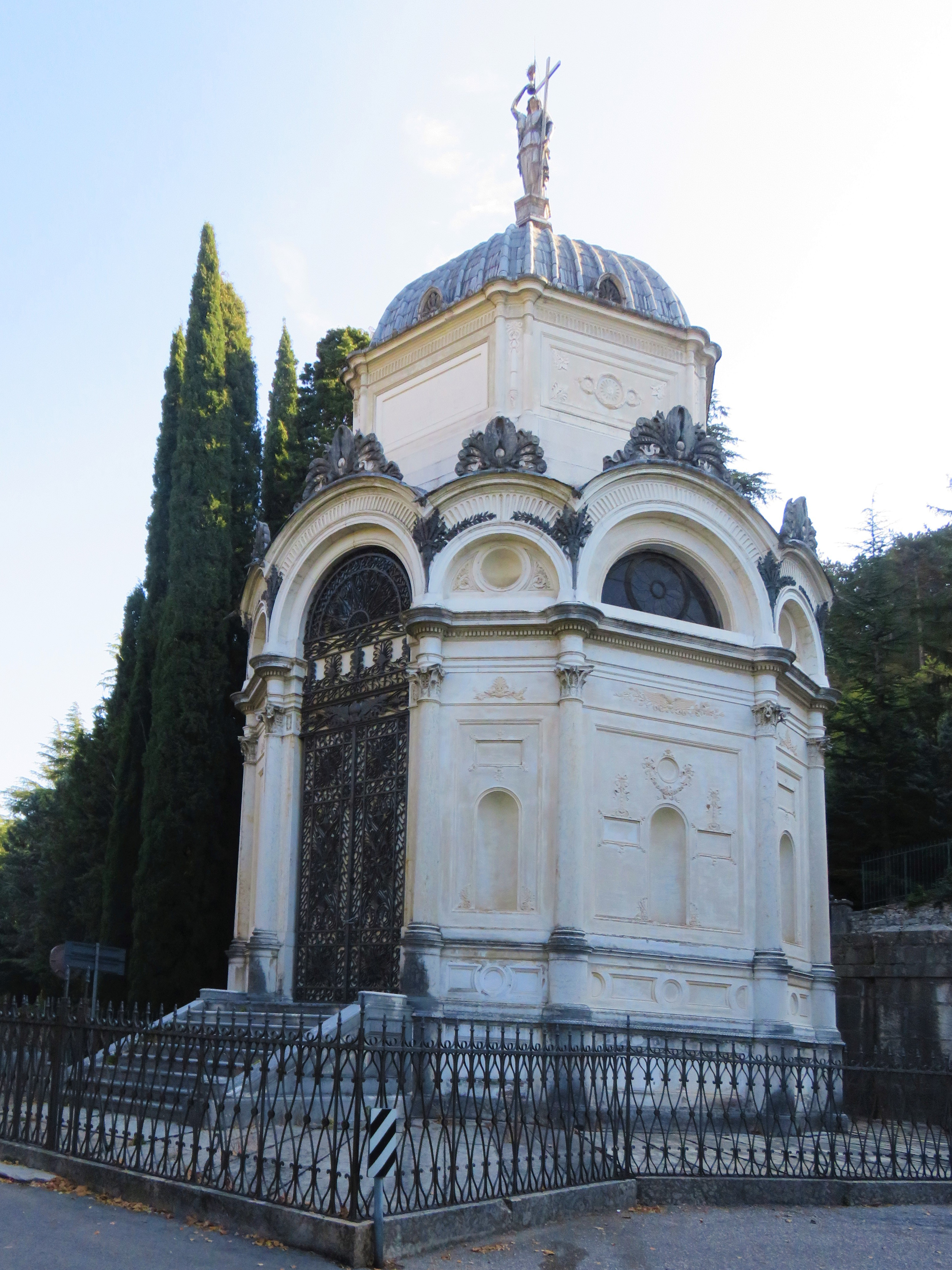
Tacchi Mausoleum, Rovereto, 1862

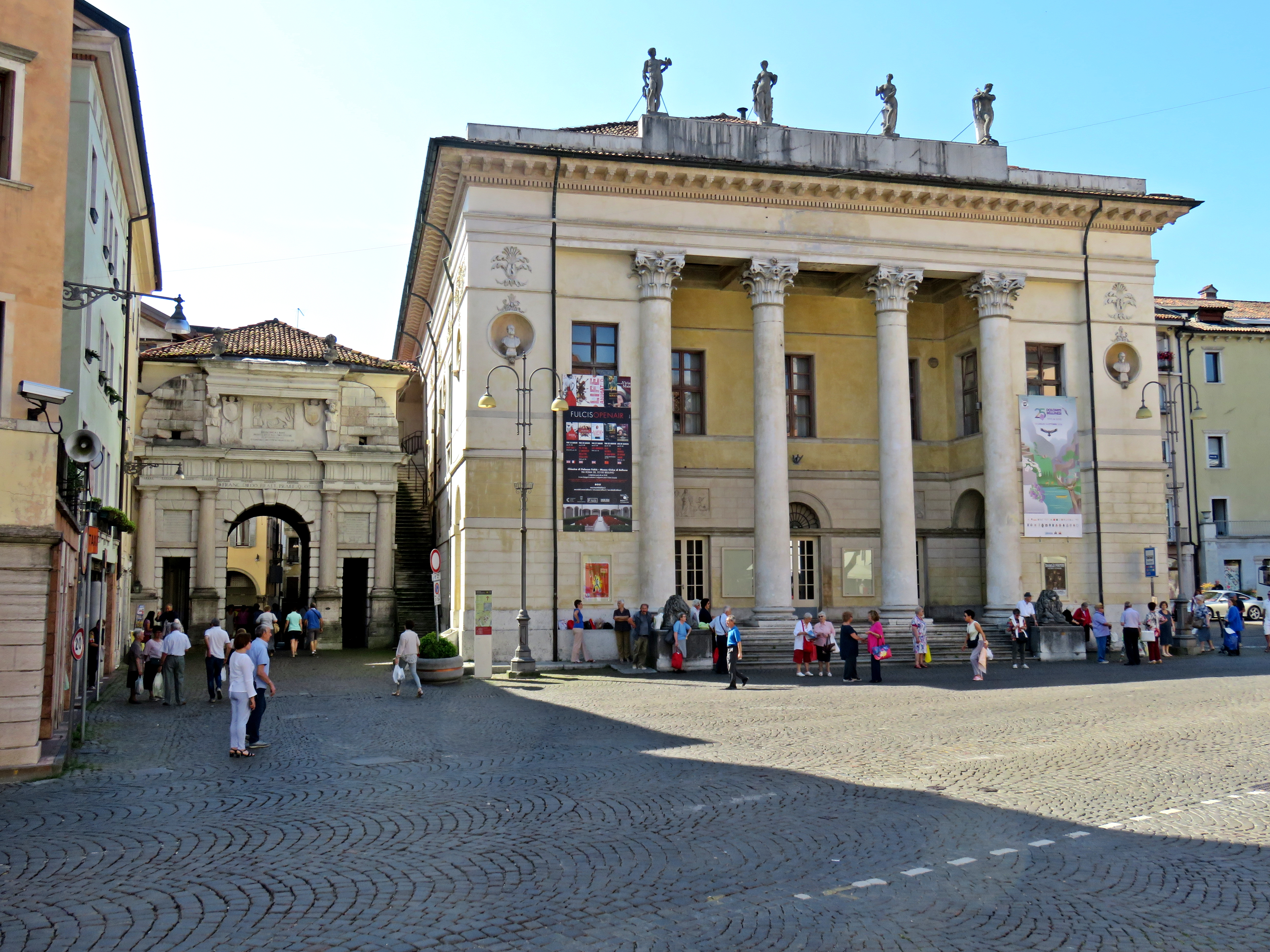
Teatro Comunale, Belluno, 1834

== Bibliography ==
- Bernardi, Jacopo (1879). Vita di Giuseppe Segusini. Feltre: P. Castaldi.
- E. Hastaba: "Segusini, Giuseppe". In: Österreichisches Biographisches Lexikon 1815–1950 (ÖBL). Vol. 12, Austrian Academy of Sciences, Vienna 2005, ISBN 3-7001-3580-7, p. 113 f. (Direct links to "p. 113", "p. 114")
