= Directory of International Associations of the Faithful =

Wikimedia list article

The Directory of International Associations of the Faithful, initially published in 2006 by the Dicastery for the Laity, Family and Life, lists the international associations of the faithful in the Catholic Church that have been granted official recognition. It gives the official name, acronym, date of establishment, history, identity, organization, membership, works, publications, and website of the communities and movements.

Recognition of similar national associations as Catholic is granted by the country's Episcopal Conference, and it is for the local bishop to grant recognition to local associations.

== List ==
The following is a list of the international associations that have received recognition, according to the Vatican website, which provides linked descriptions of each organization.

| Organization name | Acronym/ Also Known As | Founder | Established | Place established | Pontifical recognition | Notes |
|---|---|---|---|---|---|---|
| Adsis Communities | Adsis | Fr. José Luis Pérez Alvarez | 1964 | (Spain) Bilbao, Spain | 30 August 1997 | |
| Amigonian Cooperators | A.Cs | | 1992 | | 8 December 1992 | |
| Apostolic Movement of Schoenstatt | Schoenstatt Movement | Fr. Josef Kentenich | 18 October 1914 | (Germany) Schoenstatt Shrine, Vallendar, Germany | | |
| Bread of Life Community | | Pascal and Marie-Annick Pingault, Bruno and France Bouchet | 1976 | (France) Évreux, France | | |
| Catholic Fraternity of Charismatic Communities and Fellowships | Catholic Fraternity | | 1990 | (Vatican City) Vatican City | 30 November 1990 | Defunct as of 2019, replaced by CHARIS |
| Catholic Integrated Community | KIG | | | | | |
| Catholic International Education Office | OIEC | | | | | |
| Chemin Neuf Community | CCN | | | | | |
| Christian Life Community | CVX | | | | | |
| Christian Life Movement | CLM | | | | | |
| Claire Amitié | | | | | | |
| Community of the Beatitudes | | | | | | |
| "Comunità Domenico Tardini" Association | | | | | | |
| Conference of International Catholic Organisations | CICO | | | | | |
| Cooperators of Opus Dei | | | | | | |
| Couples for Christ | CFC | | | | | |
| Emmanuel Community | | | | | | |
| Encounters of Married Couples | Dialogues | | | | | |
| Encounters of Youth Promotion | EYP | | | | | |
| Fondacio. Christians for the World | Fondacio | | | | | |
| Foyers de Charité | | | | | | |
| Fraternity of Charles de Foucauld | FCF | | | | | |
| Fraternity of Communion and Liberation | CL | Fr. Luigi Giussani | 1954 | (Italy) Milan, Italy | | |
| Fraternity of St Thomas Aquinas groups | FASTA | | | | | |
| Heart's Home | | | | | | |
| Heralds of the Gospel | EP | Mons. João Scogliamino Clá Diaz | 1999 | (Brazil) São Paulo, Brazil | 22 February 2001 | |
| Holy Family Association | | | | | | |
| Immaculate Heart of Mary, Mother of Mercy Association | CIM, Totus Tuus | | | | | |
| Institute for World Evangelisation | ICPE Mission | | | | | |
| Intercontinental Christian Fraternity of the Chronic Sick and Physically Disabled | FCIPMH | | | | | |
| International Alliance of Catholic Knights | IACK | | | | | |
| International Association of "Caterinati" | | | | | | |
| International Association of Charities | AIC | | | | | |
| International Association of Faith and Light | | | | | | |
| International Association of Missionaries of Political Charity | | | | | | |
| International Catholic Centre for Cooperation with UNESCO | CCIC | | | | | |
| International Catholic Centre of Geneva | ICCG | | | | | |
| International Catholic Charismatic Renewal Services | ICCRS | | 1978 | (Belgium) Brussels, Belgium | 14 September 1993 | Defunct as of 2019, replaced by CHARIS |
| International Catholic Child Bureau | BICE | | | | | |
| International Catholic Committee for Gypsies | CCIT | | | | | |
| International Catholic Committee of Nurses and Medical Social Assistants | CICIAMS | | | | | |
| International Catholic Conference of Guiding | ICCG | | | | | |
| International Catholic Conference of Scouting | ICCS | | | | | |
| International Catholic Migration Commission | ICMC | | | | | |
| International Catholic Movement for Intellectual and Cultural Affairs | ICMICA-Pax Romana | | | | | |
| International Catholic Rural Association | ICRA | | | | | |
| International Catholic Society for Girls | ACISJF | | | | | |
| International Catholic Union of the Press | UCIP | | | | | |
| International Christian Union of Business Executives | UNIAPAC | | | | | |
| International Confederation of Professional Associations of Domestic Workers | IAG | | | | | |
| International Confederation of the Volunteers of Suffering Centers | International Confederation CVS | | | | | |
| International Coordination of Young Christian Workers | ICYCW | | | | | |
| International Council of Catholic Men | FIHC-Unum Omnes | | | | | |
| International Federation of Catholic Associations of the Blind | FIDACA | | | | | |
| International Federation of Catholic Medical Associations | FIAMC | | | | | |
| International Federation of Catholic Parochial Youth Movements | FIMCAP | | | | | |
| International Federation of Catholic Pharmacists | FIPC | | | | | |
| International Federation of Catholic Universities | IFCU | | | | | |
| International Federation of L'Arche Communities | L'Arche International | | | | | |
| International Federation of Pueri Cantores | FIPC | | | | | |
| International Federation of Rural Adult Catholic Movements | FIMARC | | | | | |
| International Forum of Catholic Action | IFCA | | | | | |
| International Independent Christian Youth | JICI | | | | | |
| International Kolping Society | IKS | Fr. Adolph Kolping | | | | |
| International Military Apostolate | AMI | | | | | |
| International Movement of Apostolate in the Independent Social Milieus | MIAMSI | | | | | |
| International Movement of Catholic Agricultural and Rural Youth | MIJARC | | | | | |
| International Movement of Catholic Students | IMCS-Pax Romana | | | | | |
| International Movement of the Apostolate for Children | MIDADE | | | | | |
| International Union of Catholic Esperantists | IKUE | | | | | |
| International Union of Catholic Jurists | UIJC | | | | | |
| International Union of European Guides and Scouts - European Scouting Federation | UIGSE-FSE | | | | | |
| International Young Catholic Students | IYCS | | | | | |
| Jesus Youth | JY | | | | | |
| Lay Claretian Movement | MSC | | | | | |
| Legion of Mary | | | | | | |
| Life Ascending International | VMI | | | | | |
| Light-Life Movement | RŚŻ | | | | | |
| "Living In" Spirituality Movement | | | | | | |
| Marianist Lay Communities | MLC | | | | | |
| Memores Domini Lay Association | Memores Domini | | | | | |
| Militia Christi | MJC | | | | | |
| Militia of the Immaculata | M.I. | | | | | |
| Missionary Community of Villaregia | CMV | | | | | |
| Missionary Contemplative Movement "P. de Foucauld" | | | | | | |
| Oasis Movement | | | | | | |
| "Pope John XXIII Community" Association | | | | | | |
| Prayer and Life Workshops | | | | | | |
| Pro Deo et Fratribus - Family of Mary | PDF-FM | | | | | |
| Promoting Group for the Movement for a Better World | PG of the MBW | | | | | |
| Regnum Christi Apostolic Movement | | | | | | |
| Salesian Cooperators Association | ACS | | | | | |
| Salesian Youth Movement | SYM | | | | | |
| Sanguis Christi Union | USC | | | | | |
| Sant'Egidio Community | | | | | | |
| Schoenstatt Women's Apostolic Union | | | | | | |
| School of the Cross | | | | | | |
| Secular Missionary Carmel | CMS | | | | | |
| "Seguimi" Lay Group of Human-Christian Promotion | | | | | | |
| Sermig | | | | | | |
| Shalom Catholic Community | CCSh | Moysés Azevedo Filho | 9 July 1982 | (Brazil) Fortaleza, Brazil | 22 February 2007 | Statutes approved by Pope Benedict XVI in 2012 |
| Silent Workers of the Cross Association | SODC | | | | | |
| St Benedict Patron of Europe Association | ASBPE | | | | | |
| Society of St Vincent de Paul | SSVP | Frédéric Ozanam | 1833 | (France) Paris, France | 1845 | |
| St Francis de Sales Association | | | | | | |
| Teams of Our Lady | END | | | | | |
| Teresian Apostolic Movement | TAM | | | | | |
| Teresian Association | T.A. | Fr. Pedro Poveda Castroverde | | | | |
| Union of Catholic Apostolate | UAC | | | | | |
| Work of Mary | Focolare Movement | | | | | |
| Work of Nazareth | ODN | | | | | |
| Work of Saint John of Avila | | | | | | |
| Work of Saint Teresa | | | | | | |
| World Catholic Association for Communication | SIGNIS | | | | | |
| World Federation of Nocturnal Adoration Societies | | | | | | |
| World Movement of Christian Workers | WMCW | | | | | |
| World Organisation of Former Pupils of Catholic Education | OMAEC | | | | | |
| World Organisation of the Cursillo Movement | OMCC | | | | | |
| World Union of Catholic Teachers | WUCT | | | | | |
| World Union of Catholic Women's Organisations | WUCWO | | | | | |
| Worldwide Marriage Encounter | WWME | | | | | |

== Other international associations of the faithful ==
Although not yet included in the latest available edition of the Directory, the Neocatechumenal Way received its definitive approval from the Pontifical Council for the Laity on 11 May 2008.
