= Teams of Our Lady =

Roman Catholic lay organization

Teams of Our Lady (French: Equipes Notre Dame, END) is a Roman Catholic lay organization recognized by the Holy See under the Pontifical Council for the Laity. It is a movement of "Married Spirituality" which brings together Christian couples united by the Sacrament of Marriage; and who wish, together, to deepen the graces of the Sacrament of Marriage. The movement is active in 75 countries.

== History ==
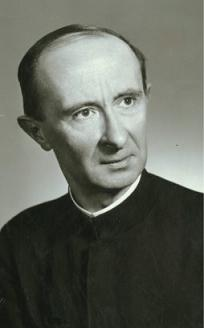
Father Henry Caffarel

Teams of Our Lady were founded in France in 1947 by Father Henry Caffarel. The movement came into being in Notre Dames Parish in Paris, France at the end of the 1930s when a number of married couples who began to meet every month in each other's houses under the guidance of Father Caffarel. As more couples sought to join them, the movement was formally established with the promulgation, on Dec. 8, 1947, of the Equipes Notre Dame Charter. The Teams of Our Lady are under the patronage of the Blessed Mother.

On April 19, 1992, the Pontifical Council for the Laity decreed recognition of the Equipes Notre Dame as an international association of the faithful of Pontifical right. In 1997 to celebrate the 50th anniversary of the Charter, Teams couples from around the world returned to Paris. Three of the original team were there to join in the celebrations.

== Expansion ==
Teams of Our Lady is an international Catholic movement active in over 75 countries. Teams came to the United States in 1958 where there teams are currently active in three languages: English, Portuguese and Spanish. It began in Washington D.C., New York and California and spread slowly around the country.

Teams of Our Lady was introduced to Great Britain in 1959. The original Cheltenham 1 team is still active. In 2009 to celebrate the Golden Jubilee, Teams couples from across Britain met at the church of St Gregory the Great in Cheltenham. As of 2021 there were 120 Teams in Britain.

== Organization ==
The international team has overall responsibility for the movement, and comprises married couples from different countries assisted by a spiritual counselor.

A team is a group of four to seven couples and a spiritual advisor who meet once a month in each other's homes to share a meal, pray together, and discuss a chosen study topic on married life and faith. The daily prayer of the movement is the Magnificat.

Teams of Our Lady proposes that its members undertake a number of specific practices called "endeavors." These include regular reading of the scripture, and daily personal prayer.

Youth Teams of Our Lady is a Catholic youth movement where young people can get together to pray and deepen their faith. It is founded on the spirituality of passage of young people towards vocations of adult life. The group organizes team meetings and retreats. Every team has a leader, a spiritual counsel and a married couple to assist, give input, and share their experiences about the things discussed in the meetings.

== See also ==
- Apostolate for Family Consecration
- Associations of the faithful
- Catholic laity
- Christian Family Movement English and Spanish North American branches of International Confederation of Christian Family Movements (ICCFM) active in 48 countries
- Couples for Christ
- Cursillo
- Decree on the Lay Apostolate
- Directory of International Associations of the Faithful
- Lay ecclesial ministry
- Marthe Robin
- Universal call to holiness
- Vocational Discernment in the Catholic Church
