= Christian Family Movement =

American movement of small Catholic parish groups

The Christian Family Movement (CFM) is a national movement of parish small groups of Catholics and their families who meet in one another's homes or in parish centers to reinforce Christian values and encourage other fellow Christian parents through active involvement with others. Its mission is "to promote Christ-centered marriage and family life; to help individuals and their families to live the Christian faith in everyday life; and to improve society through actions of love, service, education and example." CFM action groups contain five to seven families and the adults meet one or two nights each month in each other's houses.

At meetings, the members of CFM practice the Observe - Judge - Act method, usually guided by the various programs provided by the CFM USA National Office. The members discuss what they have observed in their family or neighborhood and then judge what they have observed by the standards of the life and teachings of Jesus. After these discussions, they commit to actions that will positively affect their communities, in either big or small ways. This method has led to action in such areas as "foster-parenting, prison ministry, refugee sponsorship, religious education and couple counseling".

Joseph Cardijn, the founder of the Young Christian Workers Movement in Belgium, was the originator of the Observe Judge Act method (also known as the Jocist Method).

== History ==
The first CFM groups began in the early 1940s in South Bend, Indiana and Chicago, Illinois. Burnie Bauer and his wife Helene formed a Young Christian Students group in 1940. They began to include couples into their group where they used the Jocist Method (observe/judge/act) to help young married couples with their problems trying to focus on having a Christ-centered marriage. Pat Crowley and six other men began to meet in a law office in Chicago in February 1942 to discuss the laymen's role in the church community. Using the Jocist Method they began to focus their discussions on the relationship of husband and wife in relation to the church. The group hosted a day of husband and wife recollection in 1943 that marks the start of the Cana Conference. The wives of these men began to form a group that birthed the Pre-Cana Conference (the Catholic Church's conference for engaged couples). The Christian Family Movement was born when Burnie and Helene Bauer and Pat and Patty Crowley met each other at the Cana Conference in August 1948.

The Christian Family Movement had its first national seminar in June 1949 where it was represented by 59 delegates from 11 different cities. Pat and Patty Crowley were first elected to be the Executive Secretary Couple where they led the movement for the next 20 years. CFM had become a nationwide movement. This was shown through its first publication (ACT), its official recognition by the church, and the way that CFM groups from other cities were able to communicate with each other. The first CFM program was called For Happier Families and was dispersed to over 2,500 groups within the span of a year.

The CFM moved through the country at a fast pace in the 1950s. In the 1960s CFM even caused the formation of such new organizations as the Foundation for International Cooperation (FIC) and the Christian Family Mission Vacation. The next big move of CFM was the formation of the International Confederation of Christian Family Movements (ICCFM) in 1966 which placed CFM in over 50 nations.

Membership began to shrink in the mid-1960s, from 50,000 couples in North America in 1964, to 16,000 in 1968, and down to 1,100 couples in 1980.

CFM members in 1975 wrote and tested a family centered drug awareness campaign that was published by the Department of Health, Education, and Welfare. They also worked together on the U.S. Bishop's Call the Action manuscript about the "Family". Members became joined in with the White House Conference on Families and were able to present eight position papers in 1979 and 1980. CFM and ICCFM contributed to Pope John Paul II's council on issues dealing with the family.

== The Changing Movement ==
The Christian Family Movement in the US, while still existent and active, has fewer English speaking members than in decades past, but the growth in the CFM in the Spanish Catholic community is robust. The Christian Family Movement in North America consists of three movements: CFM-USA www.cfm.org (English), MFCC-USA www.mfccusa.com (Spanish) and MFC-Los Angeles www.mfclosangeles.org (Spanish). All three are members of the International Confederation of Christian Family Movements (ICCFM), which has members in 48 countries and 4 continents, with over 90,000 families, clergy, and religious. The three US organizations reflect the increasingly multi-cultural and multi-lingual American Church. Although they are in North America, the MFCs of Mexico and Central America are associated with Latin America MFC. Over the years, the decline in membership in CFM-USA reflects the larger changes happening in the U.S. Catholic Church, particularly during the 1960s and 1970s. According to Tim Unsworth from the National Catholic Reporter, the factors contributing to the decline in CFM include the reconfirmation of the Church's prohibition on artificial birth control in Humanae Vitae, the increased number of mothers working, the increase in car travel changing parish boundaries, increasing busyness of families with other activities such as youth soccer leagues, increasing assimilation into individualistic American culture rather than closer identification with church and ethnic culture, and the idea that an increased use of Catholic schools causes parents to not see the need for having parent related conversations with other adults beyond their own spouse. The decline of the CFM can be measured throughout the years by the declining number of families involved. Robert McClory explained in his book review of Disturbing the Peace: A History of the Christian Family Movement that "after 1964 the movement shrank: from a high of 50,000 couples in the United States and Canada to 32,000 in 1967, to 16,000 in 1968, to 4,313 in 1974, to an all time low of 1,100 couples in 1980".

The MFC-Los Angeles (Spanish) was established in 1964 at the parish level. Mission San Conrado Catholic Church, Our Lady of Los Angeles (La Placita ), San Alfonso Church, St. Isabel Church were the first parishes that initiated the MFC- Los Angeles. In 1967 Our Lady of Holy Rosary initiated the MFC. The literature and material was implemented and follow the guidelines from the MFC in Chicago. In 1970 all of the coordinators from each parish was invited to attend a meeting to discuss if they can be united as a team and under the umbrella of the Los Angeles Archdioceses. In this meeting, several couples attended Roberto and Consuelo Perez, Jorge and Dora Antillon, Salvador y Maria Rangel, Enrique y Pilar Pacheco, Lauro y Tere Romero including Bishop Manuel Moreno from Tucson, Arizona. In that meeting and agreement was accepted to elect vote for couple to be presidents for a term of two years.

Responding to the U.S. Catholic Bishops' call that the 1980s be the Decade of the Family, CFM supplemented its annual program with special publications for teens, widows, families in crisis, families affected by divorce and separation, and middle-years families. In 1987, CFM contributed to the U.S. Bishops' preparation for the synod in Rome on the Vocation and Mission of the Laity in the Church and in the World. Six years later, CFM again offered input to the U.S. bishops for their 1994 pastoral letter, Follow the Way of Love. CFM's work to enhance the quality of Christian family life has been recognized by the National Association of Catholic Family Life Ministers (NACFLM) and it received a Circles of Peace Award from the Families Against Violence Advocacy Network (FAVAN) in 1999.

Starting in 1994, CFM published a column called "Taking the Time to Make a Difference", written by Paul Leingang, that has received several awards for excellence in spirituality from the Catholic Press Association of the United States and Canada. In 1999 CFM celebrated its 50-year anniversary and was awarded the Salt and Light Award by the Hillenbrand Institute.

More recently, CFM participated in the Pontifical Council for the Family in 2009 and the Marriage Summit of Catholic Family Life Organizations, which was organized by the U.S. Conference of Catholic Bishops in 2012. CFM leaders participated in preparation sessions for lay movements at the Synod on the Family in Rome in 2015.

== Leadership ==
The first national presidents were Pat and Patty Crowley from 1949 to 1968. Other presidents have been Ray and Dorothy Maldoon (1968–1977), Bob and Irene Tomonto (1977–1981), Gary and Kay Aitchison (1981–1985), Wayne and Sue Hamilton (1985–1989), Peter and Carolyn Broeren (1989–1993), Paul and Jane Leingang (1993–1997), Chuck and Jan Rogers (1997–2001), Peter and Jane Buchbauer (2001–2005), John and Lauri Przybysz (2005-2009), Bob and Anne Tomonto (2009-2013), Tom and Mary Kay Halpin (2013-2015). John and Mary Poprac (2015-2019) and the current presidents Brian and Mary Ann Thelen.

== Mission statement ==
The Mission Statement of CFM, taken directly from its website, was adopted by its board of directors on March 10, 2002. "The mission of the Christian Family Movement is to promote Christ-centered marriage and family life; to help individuals and their families to live the Christian faith in everyday life; and to improve society through actions of love, service, education and example". CFM also uses the Bible verse James 1:22—Be doers of the word, and not merely hearers—to help portray its mission to its fellow Christians.

Anthony M. Pilla, Bishop of Cleveland, explained the mission of CFM best when he addressed the Christian Family Movement on August 5, 1995.

The Church speaks clearly of the duties of family members to one another that build a radiant faith ... But the Church doesn't stop there; it also speaks of the relationship between families and the larger culture, the duty of service, working for the common good, welcoming strangers, and giving voice to the Christian conscience. That is the message; you are the messenger

— Anthony M. Pilla

== Goals ==
The Christian Family Movement website has 6 recorded goals for their members to strive to accomplish:

1. to develop a consciousness (both a family and a social consciousness) based on Christian principles and examples;
2. to develop responsible, concerned and happy families that are part of a supportive and affirming network of families within every community who will individually and collectively reach out to others in need;
3. to offer opportunities for families to grow in their personal relationships with one another as well as with their friends, neighbors and co-workers;
4. to develop a caring society that not only recognizes, but actively supports family life;
5. to initiate and encourage research on the actual needs of Christian families; and
6. to continue to foster the international spirit of the Christian Family Movement.

== The Symbol ==
The CFM symbol shows the Holy Family in silhouette behind a modern family, with the text "Christian Family Movement - CFM". It depicts the family as an active agent of evangelization, participating in the mission of Jesus. With the model of the Holy Family to guide them, the CFM family is moving forth to bring the message and the love of Christ to a changing world. Father, mother, sons and daughters are Christian emissaries to the world. This symbol was adopted in 2012.

Previously, the movement had a symbol made up of four different parts. They are the ancient signs for man, woman, and child joined together with the Christian symbol for Christ. The symbol is supposed to form a single unit that shows the most basic characteristics of the Christian Family.

Christ – covering the top of the whole symbol is the symbol for Christ; this is the "Chi Rho", which is said to hold the family together and supposed to be the center of family life. Man – shown lifting his arms to God, it represents a strong tower, being the total embodiment of the head of the family. Woman – shown reaching toward the earth, which enhances her similarity to the earth in her ability to give birth. Child - the circle is a sign of life that shows the closeness of the power of man and woman to God's power of creation.

== The Catholic Family and Lay Ministry ==
During the early years of the movement (1948-1956), CFM received some criticism because it did not fall squarely under the clerical authority of the American bishops as a whole. In particular, Father Edgar Schmiedeler, director of the National Catholic Welfare Council (NCWC), which later became the U.S. Conference of Catholic Bishops, also accused the lay movement of carrying out the ministerial work that he saw as the rightful work of the Family Life Bureau, which was under the direction of the NCWC. Still, CFM had the approval of Samuel Cardinal Stitch, of the Archdiocese of Chicago, the founding diocese of CFM. While CFM and the FLB had many of the same goals and was part of the same apostolate, Schmiedeler argued that the American Bishops had not given it official approval. In the days before the second Vatican Council, such approval was difficult to receive, in part because of differing views on jurisdictions; Kathryn Johnson notes that "the NCWC had been set up as an advisory conference" and that "bishops proved unwilling to tread on one another's individual diocesan decisions. In addition, this early conflict between CFM and the FLB was complicated by the larger changes and questions about the role of the laity in the Catholic Church, some of which were addressed during the Second Vatican Council. Individual groups would have priests serve as spiritual directors, for example, but these chaplains would struggle with how to balance the responsibility for overseeing the group's actions with a desire to allow the group to be driven by the initiative of its lay members. As one priest noted, "Clerical domination will bring [the movement] to a grinding halt. Later leaders of the NCWC and other church officials of the time, while still insisting that clear lines of authority should be maintained, admitted the grass-roots movement's benefits and felt that the conflicts between the FLB and lay movements, including CFM and the Cana Conference could have been handled better. Archbishop Patrick O'Brien, of the Archdiocese of Washington decided that the FLB could not take on CFM's active ministries, stating that it was "not equipped to go into the active field-- [it was] lacking the personnel of the right kind and the sufficient number."

Other groups like CFM, including the Young Christian Workers, the Grail Movement, and the Sister Formation Conference, prompted Catholics and the Church as a whole to reevaluate the way that the laity could play an active role in ministry:

The grassroots of CFM--the emphasis on small groups of committed Catholics working to change society--helped to construct an American Catholic identity for suburban, middle-class Catholics that depended in large measure on their own decision-making abilities.

— Kathryn Johnson, from An Effort was Made to Get Good Will: Changing Views on CFM

== See also ==
- Teams of Our Lady
- Couples for Christ
- Focus on the Family
