= Tony Meloto =

Founder of Gawad Kalinga

- Born: Antonio Meloto; January 17, 1950 (age 76); Bacolod, Negros Occidental, Philippines
- Occupation: social activist

Antonio Meloto (born January 17, 1950) is the founder of Gawad Kalinga, a Philippine-based poverty alleviation movement.

== Early life and career ==
Antonio Meloto was born on January 17, 1950, in Bacolod, Negros Occidental, to a middle-class family. He took his senior high school year at De Anza High School in Richmond, California, as an American Field Service scholar. He earned a Bachelor of Arts in Economics degree from Ateneo de Manila University, studying as a full academic scholar and graduating in 1971. He then took a job as a purchasing manager for Procter and Gamble.

== Gawad Kalinga ==
Meloto became an active member of Couples for Christ (CFC) in 1985 and quickly rose in leadership, having a key role in establishing CFC Family Ministries in 1993. In 1995 he began a youth development program for juvenile delinquents in Caloocan. Within the CFC, Meloto established Gawad Kalinga (GK) in 2003, an organization which built houses for the indigent and homeless.

In 2006 he was awarded the Ramon Magsaysay Award for Community Leadership.

By 2008, an internal dispute arose between the groups of Meloto and CFC founder Frank Padilla. The Holy See has also cautioned GK from receiving funds from companies that promoted artificial contraception. Gawad Kalinga separated from CFC in 2009. The CFC assessed that GK has neglected the evangelization aspect in favor of social work, a characterization Meloto rejects.

In May 2015, Meloto generated controversy for allegedly sexist remarks made at a conference in occasion of the 40th anniversary of the Center for Philippine Studies (CPS) at the University of Hawaii at Manoa. The CPS released a statement condemning the remarks with Meloto allegedly praising Filipino women as the greatest asset of the Philippines and proposed that they should procreate with western "best and brightest" men to make "cappuccino" children to advance the country's future.

He resigned as GK chairman in October 26, 2017 after the conduct of an internal investigation. This was later explained in 2025, after two boys filed sexual abuse charges against Meloto for incidents which occurred in 2017.

== Sexual abuse cases ==
In November 2024, two male Gawad Kalinga beneficiaries accused Meloto of sexual assault before the Department of Justice (DOJ). September 2025, the DOJ approved the filing of charges against Meloto for human trafficking after two male Gawad Kalinga beneficiaries accused him of sexual assault. He labeled the charges as a "demolition job" and a fabrication and attest faithfulness to his wife. He was arrested in Angat, Bulacan on May 29, 2026, after a warrant was issued against him by a court in Malolos.
