= Gawad Kalinga =

Philippine nongovernmental organization

- Formation: July 28, 2003 (date incorporated)
- Founder: Tony Meloto
- Type: Non-governmental organization
- Headquarters: Choa Co Siu Hoo Bldg, Brgy. Daang-Bakal, Mandaluyong, Philippines
- Chairman: Luis Oquiñena
- Key people: Daniel Bercasio (executive director)
- Website: gk1world.com

Gawad Kalinga (GK; "to give care" in Tagalog) is a Philippine non-governmental organization known officially as the Gawad Kalinga Community Development Foundation. It describes itself as a "poverty alleviation and nation-building movement".

== History ==
The Couples for Christ (CFC) started its outreach in a slum in Bagong Silang, Caloocan organizing a youth camp for juvenile gang members in 1995. It was an experiment by Tony Meloto, who is credited as the founder of Gawad Kalinga (GK). The first GK house was built for the Adduru family in 1999. The name "Gawad Kalinga", which translates in the Filipino language either as "to give care" or "to award care," was coined in 2000.

=== Isang Milyong Bayani ===
On February 25, 2006, GK launched the Isang Milyong Bayani ("One Million Heroes", also known as GK1MB) program, where volunteers from various nations would donate 4 hours of work per month to assist in GK communities. The program includes an annual event called the GK1MB Bayani Challenge, a one-week national immersion/build activity, where volunteers within the program come together to build homes in a GK community for a week. The Bayani Challenge has been held in Aurora Province and Quezon Province (2006); Albay, Camarines Sur, Sorsogon, Marinduque, and Samar (2007); Bukidnon and Lanao del Sur (2008); and Sulu and Zamboanga City (2009).

=== Separation from CFC ===
GK began as a ministry of CFC, but as it grew into a national and now worldwide presence, disagreement within the organization grew regarding its alleged secularization. On February 20, 2007, Antonio Meloto and Francisco Padilla resigned from their posts in GK. Two months later, on Easter Day, Padilla released a statement alleging that Gawad Kalinga was responsible for alleged failures of CFC in its mission of evangelization. In this statement, he enumerated 18 points to support his conclusion, including involvement with Mormons, acceptance of donations from pharmaceutical companies that produce contraceptives, gradual secularization, and erosion of CFC's presence, and excessive acknowledgment of Meloto as "founder and father" of GK.

However, what started as a conflict over GK led to division within CFC itself. The following months saw GK being criticized by Padilla and other CFC leaders (known as the "Easter Group" in homage of Padilla's article) for its failures until some bishops from the Catholic Bishops' Conference of the Philippines proposed that GK be separated from CFC. CFC stood by GK, and the Easter Group decided to convince some CFC leaders and members to separate from CFC, leading to the formation of the Couples for Christ Foundation for Family and Life (CFC FFL).

A resolution between CFC and GK was finally reached in 2009, when CFC Executive Director Joe Tale announced the major decision of the CFC International Council "to let go of the governance and corporate structure of GK" so the latter can focus on its expanding work within and outside the country as a non-religious organization.

As a result of the departure of the CFC International Council from the GK Board, Archbishop Oscar Cruz of the Lingayen-Dagupan archdiocese instructed the clergy and lay people in his area to withdraw from GK activities, because through this development, GK has disconnected itself with the Catholic Church and opened itself up to ties with organizations whose policies contradict Church teachings. This call was similarly made by Father Gammy Tulabing, a priest writing for The Negros Chronicle.

In response, Jose Tale appealed to Archbishop Cruz to reconsider the latter's instruction, particularly because of CFC's continued support of the now-autonomous GK and because of the remaining overlap in membership between the two organizations despite the change in leadership. Meanwhile, Meloto supported Tale's explanation; that there was no CFC-GK split as "no one has the right to remove Gawad Kalinga from CFC whose members have made heroic sacrifices to create this noble work that has transformed lives and deepened faith."

In 2025, the Department of Justice approved the filing of charges against Meloto for human trafficking after two male Gawad Kalinga beneficiaries accused him of sexual assault. He was arrested in Angat, Bulacan on May 29, 2026, after a warrant was issued against him by a court in Malolos.

== Development Programs ==
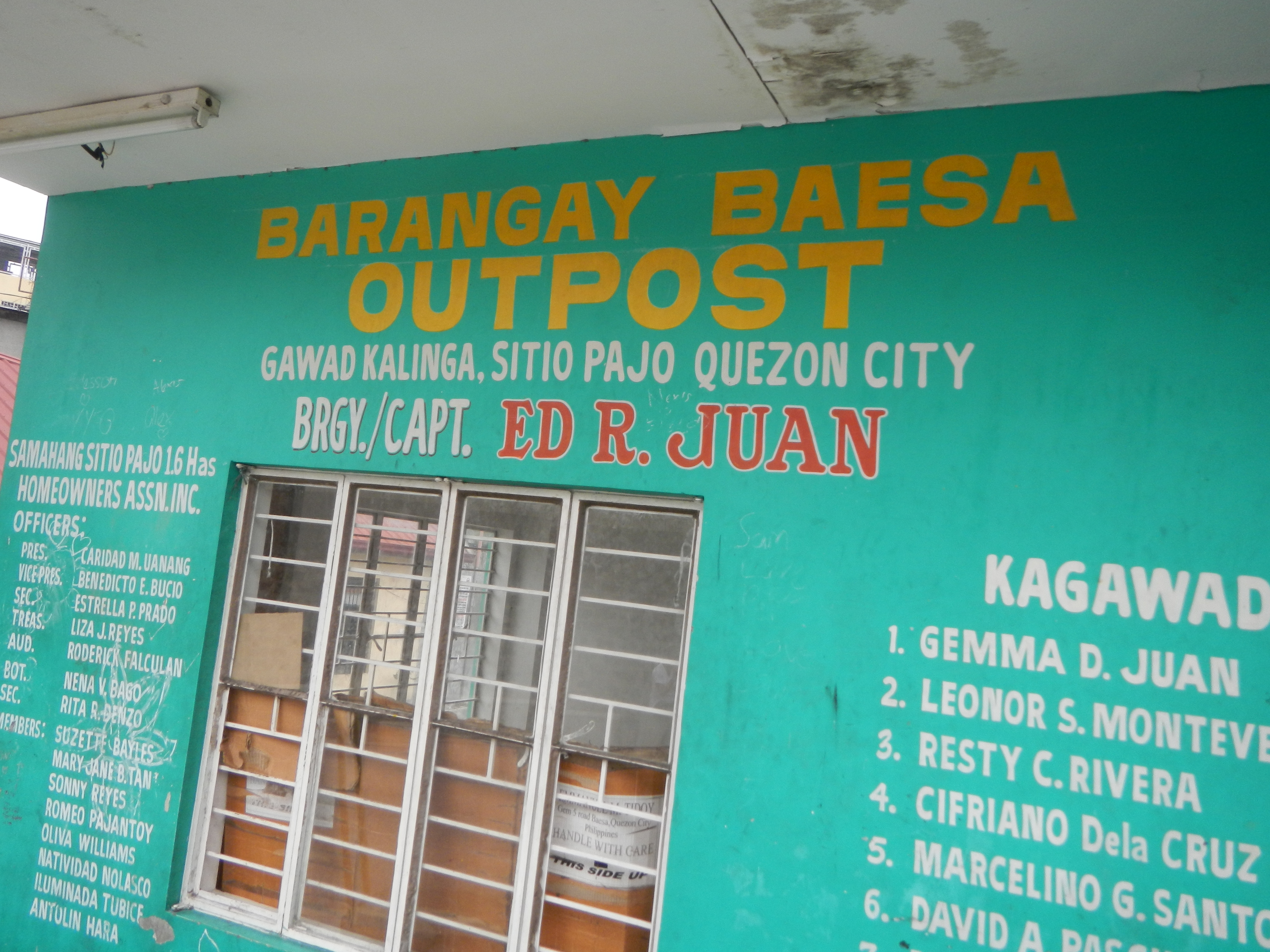
Maynilad (Bahay Toro Water Reclamation-Wet Well Station, Bahay Toro, Project 8, Pugad Lawin, Districts 1, Quezon City)

Community Infrastructure: The GK Community Infrastructure Program (CIP) builds homes and facilities (such as clinics and school buildings) for impoverished people using labour paid for by charity and the future residents of the houses themselves.

Child and Youth Development: The GK CYD program aims to develop the skills and talents of the children and youth in the GK communities by inculcating values that bring out their full potential. SIBOL, which means “to grow,” provides value-based education to pre-school children, aged 3 to 6 years old. SAGIP, which means “to save a life”, is a support program for children aged 7 to 13 years old, which consists of free academic tutorials, sports and creative workshops, and values formation classes. SIGA, which means “to light”, empowers teens to become productive citizens through sports, creative activities and mentoring sessions.

Community Building: The GK Community Building program provides GK villages with mentors who try to instill a sense of community within the villagers. This includes GK Enchanted Farm, a community meant to encourage the growth of social entrepreneurship.

Environment: The GK Environment program aims to create "green" model communities. The program operates under a tagline of "Save the poor, save the environment", and partners with environment advocacy groups and government agencies to provide seminars and environment-friendly programs for community members.

Bayan-Anihan: The GK Food Sufficiency program (or Bayan-Anihan, lit. "community harvest") is a program which aims to provide sustainable farming for its beneficiaries. In this program, families are provided a 10 sq. meter garden, and basic agricultural education by Agricultural State Universities.

GK Kalusugan: Kalusugan ("Health" in Tagalog) is a community health program with the goal of improving health among impoverished people by educating them about first aid and nutrition, as well as connecting hospitals and medical professionals to needy communities.

Center for Social Innovation: CSI (Center for Social Innovation) tries to encourage entrepreneurship and connect would-be entrepreneurs with experts and volunteers from fields necessary to build successful enterprises.

== Awards and recognitions ==
=== 2006 Ramon Magsaysay Award ===
On August 31, 2006, Gawad Kalinga and Antonio Meloto, GK Chairman, both received the 2006 Ramon Magsaysay Award for Community Leadership in relation to their work in poverty relief in the Philippines. Francisco Padilla, former CFC Executive Director and GK Chairman, received the award for GK.

== Paraiso: Tatlong Kwento ng Pag-asa ==
In 2006, GK began collaborating with some Filipino actors to produce a film about the program. The production, which translates to English as "Paradise: Three Stories of Hope", is a compilation of three films, each with a different cast. "Paraiso" is produced by Butch Jimenez, Tony Gloria, Tony Tuviera, and executive produced by Bobby Barreiro.

Umiyak Man Ang Langit (Even If Heaven Cries, directed by Jun Lana) is based on the life experiences of Jocelyn Llorente (played by Maricel Soriano). Llorente, along with her husband and six children, were victims of the mudslides in St. Bernard, Southern Leyte in February 2006, in which one of her children died. The movie follows her and her family through their recovery from this incident.

Ang Kapatid Kong Si Elvis (My Brother Elvis, directed by Joel Ruiz) is a story based on events in Southern Leyte. The story centers on a boy named Michael (played by Paulken Bustillo) who suffers from rectal prolapse and compulsively eats stones. On April 7, 2002, Dr. Jerome Paler (played by Michael V.), a GK worker in the CFC Medical Mission Foundation, visited the area where Michael lived. Upon learning of the boy's condition, Paler brought Michael to the hospital for treatment. He convinces his wife (played by Carmi Martin) and son, Pepe (Gian Bernabe), to adopt Michael as their own, where they raise and treat him.

Marie (directed by Ricky Davao) tells the story of Ruby Abad, (played by Cesar Montano), after the death of his wife, Marie Rose Abad (played by Lexi Schultz) in the September 11, 2001 attacks. Disraught, Rudy sets out to fulfill Marie's vow of helping impoverished street children in the Philippines on her behalf. Abad, a graduate of the Ateneo de Manila University, meets his former classmate Mike Goco, a GK volunteer, and Abad begins to realize that Marie Rose's dream can be fulfilled by dedicating an entire GK site for her. This site is now the Marie Rose GK Village in Baseco, Tondo, Manila.

The movie premiered on June 12, 2007, at the SM Mall of Asia, and was made available for local showing on July 4 of the same year.

== See also ==
- Couples for Christ
