= Missionário Shalom =

- Origin: Fortaleza, Ceará, Brazil
- Genres: Contemporary Catholic liturgical music, pop-rock
- Years active: 1998 – present
- Members: Gustavo Osterno; Keciane Lima; Jose Ozenir; Dudu Cardoso; Allisson Araújo; Maxsuel Lucena; Francisco Jackson (Chico); Vini Aguiar
- Past members: Ana Gabriela; Father Cristiano Pinheiro; Leozany Oliveira; Giselle Azevedo; Rafael Morel; Débora Pires; Guilherme Pontes
- Website: https://www.comshalom.org/missionarioshalom/

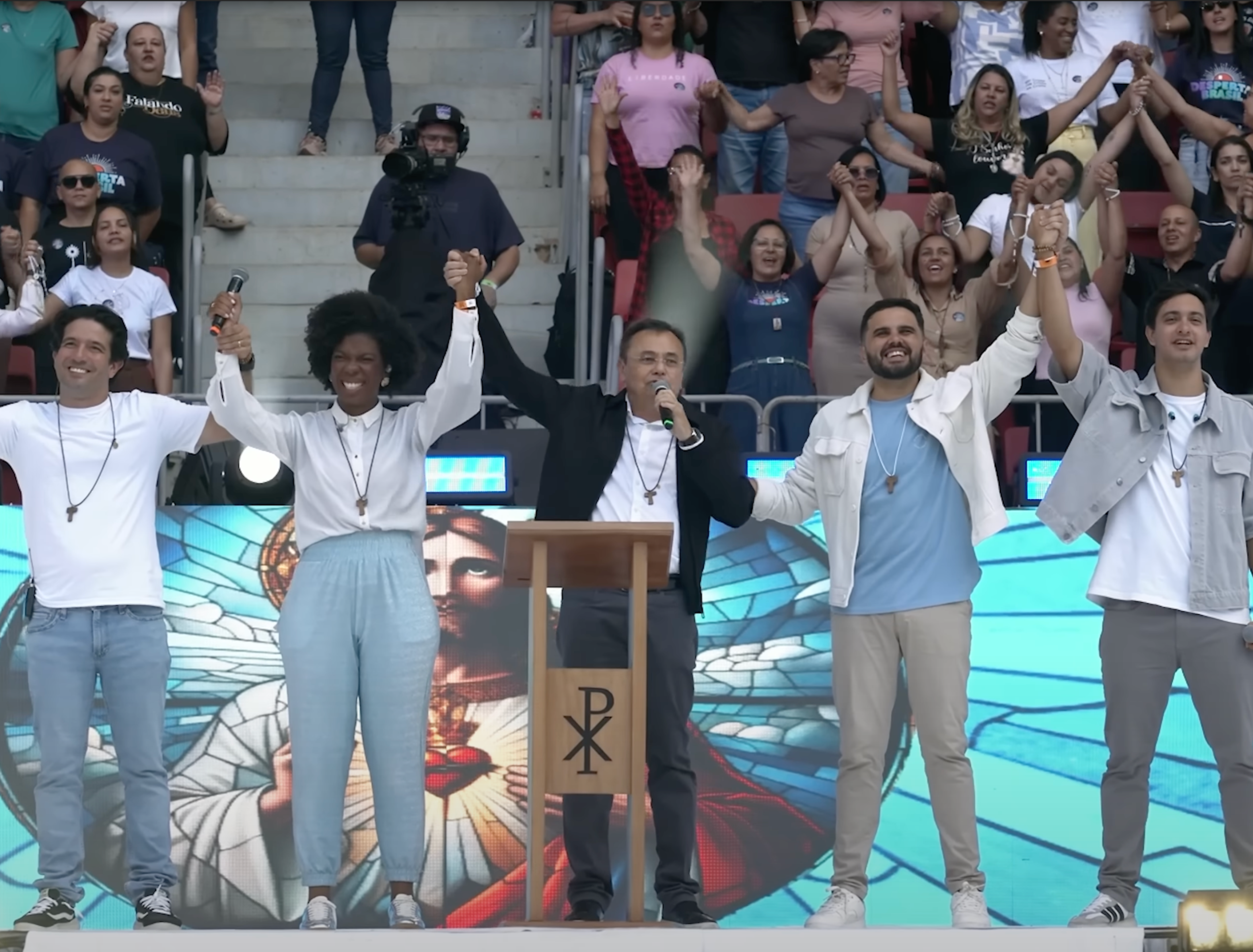

Missionário Shalom (or simply abbreviated as MSH) is a Brazilian pop-rock band of Catholic music, founded in 1998 in the city of Fortaleza, Ceará, Brazil. The group is linked to the Shalom Catholic Community, present in over 40 countries. MSH is recognized for its mission to evangelize youth through music, performing at major events such as the Halleluya Festival and the World Youth Day (WYD).

== The group ==
According to the Shalom Catholic Community website, the group was initially created as the "Missionary Music Ministry" with the aim of pursuing a bold evangelization strategy suited to contemporary realities. Another goal was to spread the Shalom charisma throughout Brazil and beyond.

The band gained international prominence by participating in World Youth Day 2011 in Madrid and World Youth Day 2013 in Rio de Janeiro, where they released their album 180 Graus. In 2018, celebrating 20 years, MSH collaborated with Sister Cristina Scuccia, winner of The Voice Italy 2014, on the single "Eis-me Aqui," recorded live at the Halleluya Festival. The song, a preparation for World Youth Day 2019 in Panama, surpassed 230,000 YouTube views in its first week.

In 2023, MSH released "Há Pressa no Ar" at the Halleluya Festival, featuring Ana Gabriela and Ziza Fernandes. In 2024, their album Fogo, with the single "Enfermo de Amor," captivated over 500,000 people at the Halleluya Festival in Fortaleza. Later that year, in December, Francisco Jackson (Chico) joined as a vocalist.

Currently, MSH remains one of the most notable Catholic music groups, performing across Brazil and internationally.

== Members ==
Current members
Gustavo Osterno
Keciane Lima
Jose Ozenir
Dudu Cardoso
Allisson Araújo
Maxsuel Lucena
Francisco Jackson (Chico)
Vini Aguiar
Former members
Ana Gabriela
Father Cristiano Pinheiro
Leozany Oliveira
Giselle Azevedo
Rafael Morel
Débora Pires
Guilherme Pontes

== Discography ==
Missionário Shalom Albums
Name	Release Year	Type
Sou Teu Pai	1999	CD
Uno e Trino	2000	CD
Todo Teu	2001	CD
Lançai as Redes	2002	CD
Tempo de Viver	2004	CD
Estrangeiro Aqui	2005	CD
Malas Prontas	2010	CD
180 Graus	2013	CD
Ao Vivo no Halleluya	2016	CD e DVD
MSH en Español	2016	EP
MSH Remix	2018	EP
Mais que Tudo (Ao Vivo)	2019	CD
Mais Que Tudo, Vol. 1 (Ao Vivo)	2020	EP
O Santo Rosário	2021	CD
Vocacional - Sem Medo Eu Vou	2021	CD
Memórias (Campanha Vocacional Forjados na Esperança)	2022	EP
Vocacional Shalom 2023	2023	EP
Fogo	2024	CD
Singles (selection)
Eis-me Aqui (with Sister Cristina)	2018	Single
Ressuscita-me Agora	2020	Single
Aos Teus Pés	2021	Single
Há Pressa no Ar	2023	Single
Enfermo de Amor (from Fogo)	2024	Single
Ele Voltará	2024	Single

== See also ==
- Shalom Catholic Community
- Contemporary Catholic liturgical music
- Catholic Charismatic Renewal
- Halleluya Festival
