= World Youth Day 2027 =

Catholic festival in Seoul, South Korea

- Date: August 3–8, 2027
- Location: Seoul, South Korea; 37°34′N 126°59′E
- Type: Youth festival
- Theme: Take Courage, I have overcome the world (John 16:33)
- Organised by: Catholic Church
- Participants: Pope Leo XIV
- Previous: 2023 Lisbon
- Website: wydseoul.org/en

Korean name
- Hangul: 2027 세계청년의날
- RR: 2027 Segye cheongnyeonui nal
- MR: 2027 Segye ch'ŏngnyŏnŭi nal

World Youth Day 2027 (Korean: 2027 세계 청년의 날) will be a Catholic festival taking place in Seoul, South Korea from August 3–8, 2027. It was announced by Pope Francis at the end of the closing Mass of World Youth Day 2023 in Lisbon, Portugal. Following Francis’ death in 2025, Pope Leo XIV will lead the event, making it the first World Youth Day under his papacy. It will also be the first World Youth Day to take place in Asia since Manila, Philippines in 1995, as well as the first to ever be held in a Christian-minority country.

== Announcement ==
The announcement of the event was made by Pope Francis on August 6, 2023, after the closing Mass of World Youth Day in Lisbon, held in Tagus Park, Portugal. At the time of the announcement, approximately 1.5 million people were present.

South Korea does not have a majority religious group, but it has experienced an increase in the number of Christians, who represent approximately 30% of the population, of whom 12% are Catholic.

Now, we come to an eagerly awaited moment: the announcement of the next stage of the journey. Before telling you the venue of the forty-first World Youth Day, I extend an invitation to each of you. I invite young people from all over the world to Rome in 2025, to celebrate together the Jubilee for Young People. I look forward to seeing you in 2025 for the celebration of the Jubilee for Young People. The next World Youth Day will take place in Asia: in South Korea, in Seoul in 2027! Thus, from the western border of Europe it will move to the Far East. This is a marvellous sign of the Church’s universality and of the dream of unity to which you bear witness!

== Theme ==
At a press conference on September 24, 2024, the Holy See announced the theme for the event: "Take courage! I have overcome the world" (John 16:33). The announcement was made by Cardinal Kevin Farrell, Prefect of the Dicastery for the Laity, Family and Life. Cardinal Farrell, Archbishop Peter Chung Soon-taick, Bishop Paul Kyung Sang Lee and Gabriela Su-Ji Kim, a young Korean leader, spoke about the spiritual preparations for the event, its significance for young people globally, and its connection to Korean culture. The theme, taken from the Gospel of John, encourages young people to face challenges with courage and hope.

The handover of the World Youth Day Cross and the icon of Mary from Lisbon to Seoul took place during the Solemnity of Christ the King on November 24, 2024, marking the beginning of the Korean Church's preparations for the event.

The event is planned as a gathering of young people from around the world for a pilgrimage focused on faith, dialogue and celebration in the Far East.

== Patron Saints ==
On Good Shepherd Sunday, April 26, 2026, the World Youth Day Local Organizing Committee officially released the five patron saints of the 2027 World Youth Day. They are the following Saints:

- Saint John Paul II (pope, founding father and patron saint of the World Youth Day)
- Saint Andrew Kim Taegon (priest and martyr; patron saint of South Korea)
- Saint Frances Xavier Cabrini (religious)
- Saint Josephine Bakhita (religious)
- Saint Carlo Acutis (young layman; patron saint of youths)

== Logo ==
The logo for the 2027 World Youth Day was unveiled on September 24, 2024. It was designed by Jin Su-hyeon, a 26-year-old researcher at the Hongik University Environmental Art Research Institute. The logo features a cross and the Korean character Ieung, which is placed at the center of the cross. The color palette consists of red, blue, and black.

The cross is formed by two brush strokes — one red and one blue. The red stroke symbolizes "blood-stained martyrdom", while the blue stroke represents "the energy of youth". At the center of the cross, the circular figure ieung envisions the glory of Jesus' victory, reflecting the theme of this edition of World Youth Day. The black color in the palette signifies the mysterious future awaiting the youth.

The word "Seoul" (Korean: 서울) in the logo is written in Hangul calligraphy but is formed using the letters 'W', 'Y', and 'D', symbolizing the unity of youth from around the world who will gather in Seoul.

The brush strokes in the logo were inspired by the painting Inwang jesaekdo by the late Joseon-era artist Jeong Seon (also known as Gyeomjae). This painting depicts the view of Inwang Mountain in Seoul after the rain.

== Official anthem ==
In 2025, the Local Organizing Committee of World Youth Day Seoul 2027, together with the Dicastery for the Laity, the Family and Life, opened an international competition to select the official theme song for the event. The contest was open regardless of nationality or place of residence, and entries could be submitted in any of the official languages of World Youth Day: Korean, English, Italian, Spanish, French, or Portuguese.
