= Shalom FM =

Rádio Shalom (ZYV 848)
- Fortaleza, Ceará; Brazil
- Frequency: 91.7 MHz

Programming
- Language: Portuguese
- Format: Evangelism; Christian music

Ownership
- Owner: Rádios e Jornais do Ceará S.A.
- Operator: Shalom Catholic Community
- Sister stations: Shalom FM

History
- Founded: March 25, 1958
- Former call signs: ZYH 29; ZYH 585
- Former names: Rádio Dragão do Mar

Technical information
- Licensing authority: ANATEL
- Class: A2
- ERP: 73.7 kW

Links
- Public license information: Profile
- Website: redeshalomderadio.com

Rádio Shalom (ZYV 848) is a radio station licensed to Fortaleza, Ceará, serving the respective metropolitan area. It is maintained by the Shalom Catholic Community and is part of the Rede Shalom de Rádio, along with Shalom FM in Pacajus. Founded on March 25, 1958 as Rádio Dragão do Mar, an AM radio station, it has been controlled by the Catholic organization since 2008. In March 2025, it became an FM radio station after undergoing a migration process.

== History ==
=== Rádio Dragão do Mar (1958-2008) ===
The setting up of Rádio Dragão do Mar was initiated by the Social Democratic Party (in Portuguese, Partido Social Democrático, PSD), which aimed to contest the 1958 general elections. The party was in strong opposition to the National Democratic Union (in Portuguese, União Democrática Nacional, UDN), which was in government in the state of Ceará through Paulo Sarasate. The concession to operate the station was decreed on November 20, 1957. At the same time, the station was already making experimental broadcasts directly from the 11th floor of the Edifício Arara, known for having housed the Instituto de Aposentadorias e Pensões dos Comerciários (IAPC), in Centro. Journalist Blanchard Girão was responsible for drawing up the radio program.

Rádio Dragão do Mar was officially inaugurated on March 25, 1958 by businessman Moisés Pimentel. The station was inaugurated on the day that commemorated the abolition of slavery in the province of Ceará and was named after the jangadeiro leader Francisco José do Nascimento, known as Dragão do Mar (Sea Dragon), at the suggestion of broadcaster Peixoto de Alencar due to the protest line the station would take. Other names suggested were Rádio Capital and Rádio Fortaleza. The radio station's theme song was "Terra da Luz", a hymn of exaltation written by Humberto Teixeira and Lauro Maia. Its programming was eclectic, but it had a strong political emphasis, especially in the interests of the PSD, when it denounced problems with the UDN's administration. Radio journalism at the station was set up by Peixoto de Alencar and it was run by the brothers Almir and Artur Pedreira, with the then state deputy Franklin Chaves in charge of political direction. One of its initial features was the editorial A Nossa Palavra, a chronicle written by Blanchard Girão that was read by Waldir Xavier at 12:30 p.m. As well as journalism, it had entertainment programs and a radio drama cast.

The station quickly became popular and also began to invest in other sectors, such as sport, forming teams with Ivan Lima, Gomes Farias, Paulino Rocha, Josely Moreira, among other names. The radio achieved prestige among the commercial sector and moved public opinion. However, it faced disputes with the government, when a reporting team was arrested on the orders of General Severino Sombra. In response, the president of the Associação Cearense de Imprensa (ACI), Perboyre e Silva, organized a march of cars from the ACI headquarters to the Military Police Barracks, with competing stations broadcasting the event. The journalists were prevented from entering the premises and went to Praça dos Voluntários, in the center, where a new demonstration took place, demanding the release of the prisoners, who managed to be freed. Dragão do Mar gained empathy with the public and managed to elect journalist José Parsifal Barroso to the state government that same year.

At the end of the movements and the election of their gubernatorial candidate, the PSD gave up on keeping Rádio Dragão do Mar after inheriting a high payroll. They therefore transferred command of the station to industrialist Moisés Pimentel in 1959. The station remained critical of politics when they supported the inauguration of Vice-President João Goulart in 1961 and the progressive ideals of the time. It was at this point that the station began to come under siege from the military. In the same year, when they received information that an extreme right-wing group was planning to invade the station and destroy the transmitters, the management of Dragão do Mar decided to connect a high-voltage current to the barbed wire fences surrounding their headquarters. The attack could be avoided, however, as an army officer stayed at the station to read the news that would be announced on the air beforehand and to prohibit information that could affect military purposes. Rádio Dragão do Mar also served, at this time, as a shelter for student demonstrators who were being harassed by the police.

In 1962, the broadcaster's board of directors was elected to political office. Pimentel was elected federal deputy for the Social Labor Party (in Portuguese, Partido Social Trabalhista, PST) and was starting to set up the future TV Dragão do Mar, acquiring equipment and presenting it to the local media. However, Pimentel ended up having the TV and radio concessions revoked by the military on April 17, due to the coup d'état that took place during the period. Rádio Dragão do Mar had already been closed down at around midnight on April 1. The station's studio was surrounded by military personnel, who had Nazareno Albuquerque as coordinator and Orlando Braga as technician. Pimentel and Blanchard Girão, the latter of whom also had his position as a state deputy revoked, were arrested, as were the station's other professionals and announcers.

After months of inactivity, Rádio Dragão do Mar returned to the air under the command of retired military officer Almir de Mesquita, but without the characteristics that had made it popular in previous years. The military officer had links with Moisés Pimentel and wanted to make the station a useful instrument for society once again. The reopening marked a change in headquarters, which moved between Antônio Sales and Virgílio Távora avenues. It was acquired by the family of politician César Cals in 1985, with Sérgio Cals as CEO, and moved to Rua 25 de Março. The new administration implemented a popular model, with informative and musical programs, while maintaining space for religious attractions. Despite the changes, the station continued to hold festivities in March. In 2005, it celebrated its 45th anniversary in a solemn session at the Legislative Assembly of Ceará.

=== Rádio Shalom (2008-present) ===
In August 2008, the station was sold to the Shalom Catholic Community. Shalom, which had entered the dial with the lease of Rádio Assunção Cearense in 2000, left the station in May 2006 and was negotiating with the management of Rádio Dragão do Mar to buy it. In the meantime, it had been operating an FM radio station in Pacatuba owned by the Fundação José Possidônio Peixoto on 102.9 MHz, which until then had broadcast Rádio Canção Nova. Rádio Dragão do Mar's programming was shut down on September 30, 2008, and it was inaugurated as Rádio Shalom the following day. All the employees who worked at the station were fired and commercial contracts that were still in force were canceled. The sale of the station took the local media by surprise, as the information was made public when the station failed to cover the elections that year, according to the newspaper O Estado, in addition to the fact that the radio station had just celebrated its 50th anniversary. The station's announcers migrated their programs to other AM radio stations in Fortaleza. At the time, Rádio Shalom's programming consisted only of religious music. During the transition period, the Sindicato dos Radialistas Profissionais do Estado do Ceará stated that it would investigate the sale negotiation with Anatel.

Under the administration of pr. Antônio Furtado, Rádio Shalom continued to carry the name Dragão do Mar and preserved its inauguration date. It also left the premises on Rua 25 de Março, which were sold, and moved to Rua Maria Tomásia, in Aldeota.The broadcaster sponsors events linked to the Shalom Catholic Community, such as the Halleluya Festival and Evangelizar é Preciso. It is currently the generator of the Rede Shalom de Rádio, made up of Rádio Boa Nova and, initially, Rádio Shalom Iracema do Cariri, which had signed a partnership with Shalom in December 2015, as well as a pool of 13 other radio partners. Rádio Iracema do Cariri left the network in June 2017.

== Bibliography ==
- Girão, Blanchard (2005). Só as armas calaram a Dragão. Fortaleza, Ceará: ABC Editora. ISBN 8575361597.
