= Moysés Louro Azevedo Filho =

Brazilian Catholic leader (born 1959)

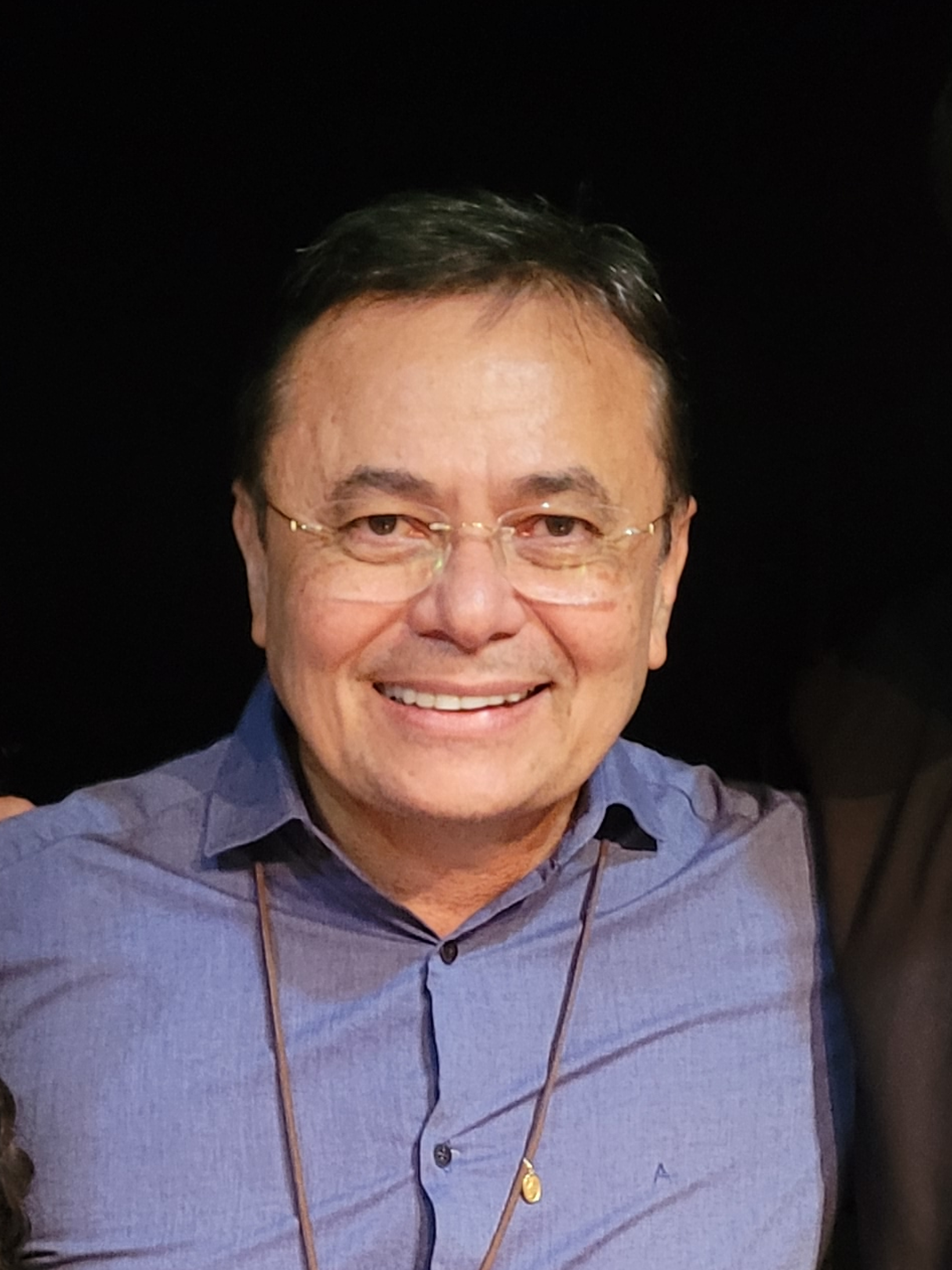
Image of Moysés Azevedo

Moysés Louro de Azevedo Filho (born November 4, 1959, in Fortaleza, Ceará) is a Brazilian religious leader, the founder and general moderator of the Shalom Catholic Community, an ecclesial Catholic movement linked to the Catholic Charismatic Renewal (CCR). Since 2019, he has been a member of the Dicastery for Laity, Family and Life, and since 2023, of the Dicastery for Evangelization, both under the Holy See. A celibate, he resides in Aquiraz, Ceará, at the community's headquarters.

== Biography ==
Moysés was born into a traditional Catholic family, the only son after five sisters. His mother, who gave birth to him at age 44, wished for him to become a priest, though he rejected the idea during his teenage years. He studied at Colégio Marista Cearense and, at 15, attended a youth event organized by the Archdiocese of Fortaleza, where he had a transformative encounter with Jesus Christ.

He began a Geology course but dropped out after two years, later graduating in Physiotherapy due to an interest in human suffering, though he never practiced the profession. In 1980, he was chosen by Archbishop Aloísio Lorscheider to represent the youth of the archdiocese during Pope John Paul II's visit to Brazil. At the X National Eucharistic Congress in Fortaleza, he handed the Pope a letter offering his life to evangelize young people. Two years later, on July 9, 1982, he founded the Shalom Community, starting with a snack bar in the Aldeota neighborhood, now known as "Shalom da Paz" (Shalom of Peace).

== Ecclesial life ==
The Shalom Community was recognized by the Holy See as a private association of the faithful in 2007 under Pope Benedict XVI. Moysés participated in the Synods on the Eucharist (2005) and the Word of God (2008) in Rome, as well as the V Episcopal Conference of Latin America in Aparecida (2007), representing ecclesial movements.

From 2007 to 2019, he served as a consultant to the Pontifical Council for the Laity, and from 2011 to 2023, to the Pontifical Council for Promoting the New Evangelization.Since 2019, he has been part of the Dicastery for Laity, Family and Life, and on April 25, 2023, he was appointed to the Dicastery for Evangelization.

On April 27, 2022, Moysés met with Pope Francis in Saint Peter's Square, inviting him to the Shalom Community's 40th-anniversary convention, held in Rome in September 2022.

== Shalom Community ==
The Shalom Community emerged with the aim of evangelizing young people through a snack bar, offering items with biblical names to spark conversations about faith. Today, it is present in over 30 countries, promoting events like the Halleluya Festival and social outreach programs. Moysés describes the community's charism as a "gift of the Holy Spirit" to renew the Church.

== Vision and legacy ==
Moysés emphasizes evangelization as a call to share "divine love," rejecting contemporary religious indifference. The Shalom Community's charismatic style, featuring lively music and practices like "resting in the Spirit," has attracted young people but also drawn criticism from traditional sectors of the Church. He argues that transforming the human heart is the path to changing the world.
