= Igreja do Ressuscitado =

Church of the Risen One Who Passed Through the Cross
- Igreja do Ressuscitado Que Passou Pela Cruz
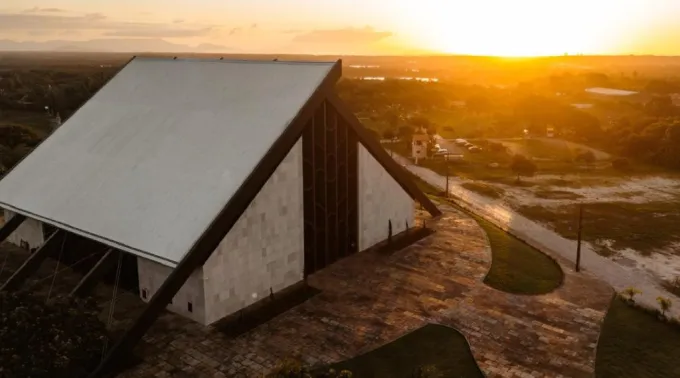
- Façade of the Church of the Risen One Who Passed Through the Cross in Aquiraz
- Church of the Risen One Who Passed Through the Cross
- 3.91756022155009°S 38.38913894638252°W
- Location: Aquiraz, Ceará, Brazil
- Country: Brazil
- Denomination: Roman Catholic Church
- Website: www.comshalom.org

History
- Status: Active
- Dedication: November 1, 2024
- Consecrated: November 1, 2024

Architecture
- Architect: Shalom Catholic Community
- Architectural type: church
- Style: Contemporary
- Years built: 2013–2024
- Completed: November 1, 2024

Specifications
- Capacity: 1,000 worshippers
- Height: 26 meters

Administration
- Archdiocese: Archdiocese of Fortaleza

The Church of the Risen Christ Who Passed Through the Cross is a Catholic temple located in Aquiraz, Ceará, Brazil, at the General Diaconia headquarters of the Shalom Catholic Community. Dedicated on November 1, 2024, it is the first church constructed by the community, spanning 2,216 m² and accommodating approximately 1,000 worshippers. The dedication ceremony was presided over by Dom Gregório Paixão, Archbishop of the Archdiocese of Fortaleza, with the presence of the Apostolic Nuncio to Brazil, Dom Giambattista Diquattro.

== History ==
Construction began in 2013 with the blessing of the cornerstone and was completed in 2024. The church is regarded as a milestone for the Shalom Community, founded in 1982 by Moysés Azevedo, reflecting its charism centered on the paschal mystery of Christ. The contemporary-style design has been featured in reports for its spiritual and architectural significance in the metropolitan region of Fortaleza.

== Notability ==
The temple's dedication drew around 6,000 attendees and received widespread coverage from Catholic and regional media outlets, such as Vatican News and the newspaper O Povo, highlighting its importance as the first church worldwide with this title.
