= World Youth Day 2023 =

International Catholic youth event

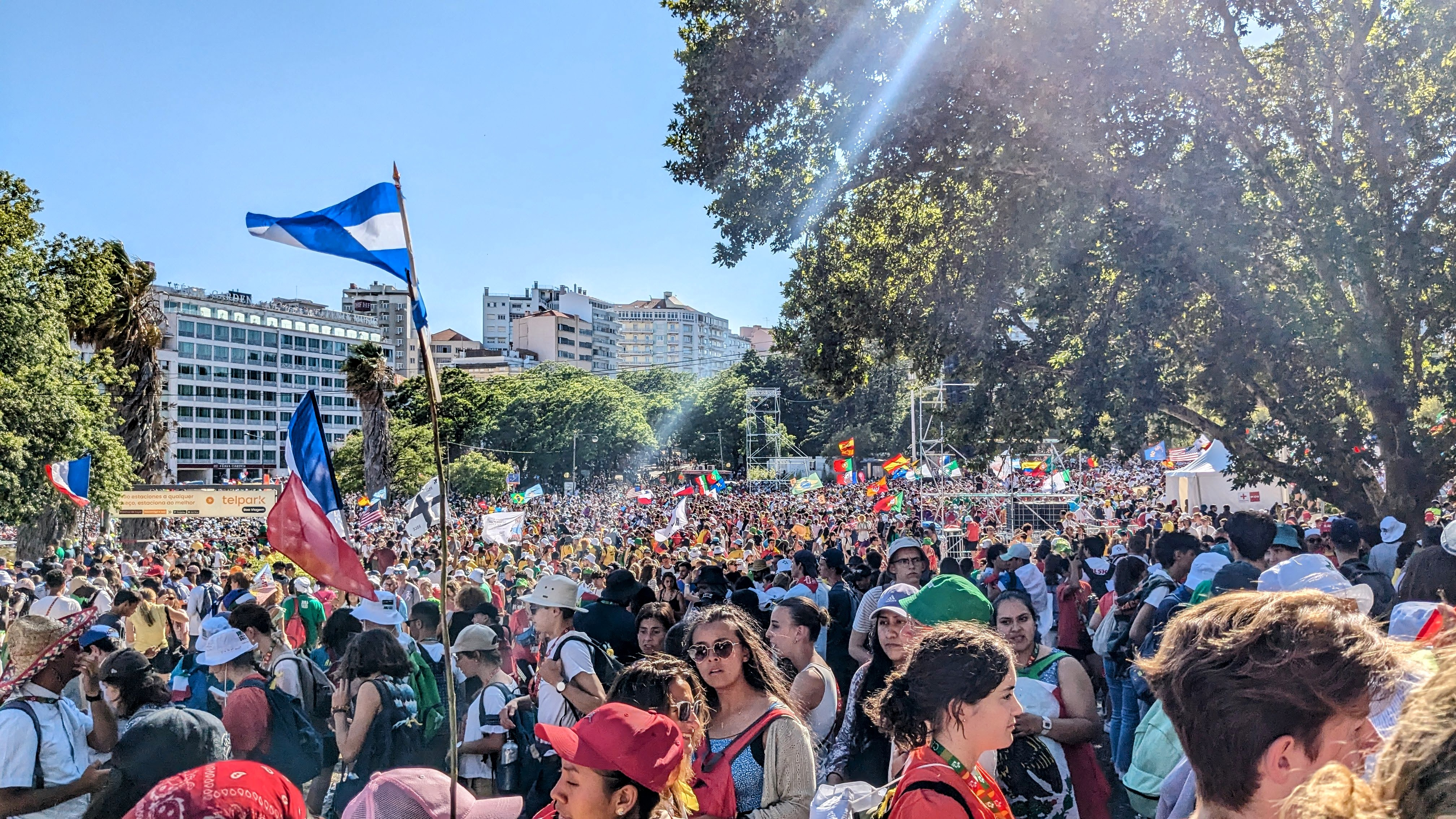
- Crowds at the Welcoming Ceremony for Pope Francis
- Date: 1–6 August 2023
- Location: Lisbon, Portugal; 38.791258°N 9.094121°W
- Type: Youth festival
- Theme: Mary arose and went with haste (Lk 1:39)
- Organised by: Catholic Church
- Participants: Pope Francis
- Previous: 2019 Panama City
- Next: 2027 Seoul
- Website: www.lisboa2023.org/en/

World Youth Day 2023 (Portuguese: Jornada Mundial da Juventude de 2023) was the 2023 installment of World Youth Day, a recurring Catholic festival. The 2023 event was held in Lisbon, Portugal, which was announced at World Youth Day 2019 in Panama City, Panama.

About 354,000 pilgrims from more than 200 countries were registered, including 688 bishops, and the event was aided by 25,000 volunteers. The closing Vigil and Mass had an estimated 1.5 million attendees.

This was Pope Francis's last World Youth Day as he would pass away on April 21, 2025.

== Host city ==
The host city for a 2022 event, was announced by Pope Francis and Bishop Kevin Farrell at the end of the closing Mass of the World Youth Day 2019 event in Panama City. in the presence of thousands of young people from all over the world, including 300 Portuguese young people. Also present were the Patriarch of Lisbon, Manuel Clemente, the president of the Portuguese Republic, Marcelo Rebelo de Sousa, the secretary of state for Youth and Sports, João Paulo Rebelo, representing the Government of Portugal, and the mayor of Lisbon, Fernando Medina, as well as ambassadors, six bishops (from the dioceses of Lisbon, Guarda, Coimbra, Braga and Bragança-Miranda) and several priests. In a press conference, the president of the Episcopal Conference of Portugal (CEP) said that he expected to receive between 1 and 2 million young people in the summer of 2022 and added that the "more than probable" place for the conclusive events of WYD 2022 will be the margin north of the Tagus river, next to the Sea of Palha, in Lisbon, and that evokes the Sea of Galilee where Jesus walked.

The Holy See announced on 20 April 2020 that the event would be postponed due to the COVID-19 pandemic. It was rescheduled for 1–6 August 2023.

Although the main event took place next to the Parque do Tejo in Lisbon, with new infrastructures built under the coordination of architect António Maria Braga, there were also expected pilgrimages from the participating youth to the National Sanctuary of Christ the King, in Almada, to the Sanctuary of Our Lady of Fatima, in Cova da Iria, and also to the birthplace of Saint Anthony of Lisbon (or Padua).

Some unwelcome revelations for the Church of Portugal arose ahead of the World Youth Day celebration, including sanctions against and investigations into bishops affiliated with Portugal.

== Patrons and intercessors ==
The patrons of the World Youth Day 2023 are Catholic figures who, in their youth, took decisive steps on the path to holiness:

- Saint John Paul II (pope)
- Saint John Bosco (priest and founder of the Salesian Congregation)
- Saint Vincent of Saragossa (deacon and martyr)
- Saint Anthony of Lisbon (Franciscan friar and Doctor of the Church)
- Saint Bartolomeu dos Mártires (Dominican friar and Catholic archbishop)
- Saint John de Brito (Jesuit missionary and martyr)

And the blessed:

- Blessed Joana of Portugal and Coimbra (Portuguese princess and Dominican nun)
- Blessed João Fernandes (young Jesuit and martyr)
- Blessed Maria Clara of the Child Jesus (founder of the Congregation of the Franciscan Hospitaller Sisters of the Immaculate Conception)
- Blessed Pier Giorgio Frassati (young layman)
- Blessed Marcel Callo (young scout and martyr)
- Blessed Chiara Badano (young laywoman of the Focolare Movement)
- Blessed Carlo Acutis (young layman)

Additionally, the official website of the WYD mentioned the Blessed Virgin Mary as the "patroness par excellence" of the event.

=== Devotion ===
The sculpture number 1 of the Pilgrim Virgin of Fatima traveled, in the early hours of 21 January 2019, to Panama to be present at the World Youth Day 2019, evoking the memory of the Marian imprint that Pope John Paul II wished to print at the creation of these great Catholic religious events. Continuing this spirit, at the World Youth Day 2023 the young people will be especially invited to pray and to deepen the main devotion recommended in the apparitions of the Blessed Virgin Mary at the Cova da Iria, in Fatima, in particular the prayer of the Holy Rosary.

=== Theme ===
On 22 June 2019, Pope Francis announced that the theme of the event would be "Mary arose and went with haste" (Luke 1:39). This Bible verse also takes into account the start of her visitation with her cousin Elizabeth. The pope also called on Catholics to prepare for the 2023 World Youth Day by meditating on two scriptural passages: Luke 7:14, "Young man, I say to you, Arise!"; and a re-working of Acts 26:16, "Stand up. I appoint you as a witness of what you have seen".

== Journey ==
A number of activities occurred throughout the World Youth Day. The "City of Joy" was the term given to the combined area containing the Vocations Fair (for learning about religious orders and other organizations) and the Park of Forgiveness (for receiving the Sacrament of Penance). "Rise Up Encounters" included activities allowing pilgrims to reflect on Pope Francis' themes of Integral Ecology, Social Friendship and Mercy. Interreligious events provided guided visits to a Muslim mosque, Hindu temple, Jewish synagogue, and three historic Catholic churches.

=== Preparations ===
On July 25, Pope Francis spoke on a podcast, dubbed the "Popecast", in which he addressed prepared questions from youth, ending with an encouragement for youth around the world to take part in World Youth Day, saying that they would find it fulfilling, with its community, celebration, hope, and joy.

On July 27, all event volunteers participated in the "Missionary Gesture" to share World Youth Day with the most vulnerable. Over 600 institutions, such as hospitals and prisons, were visited.

=== 1 August ===
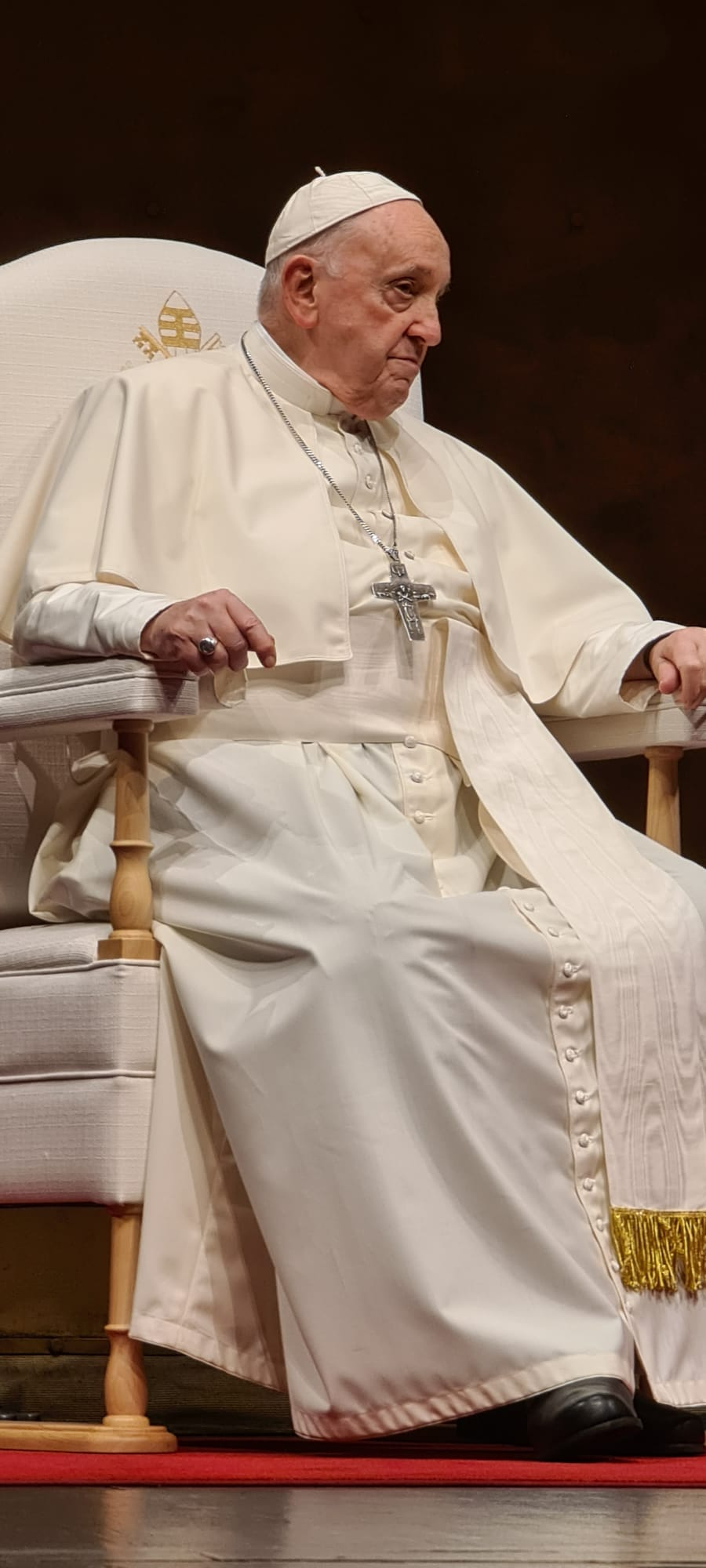
The Pope Francis in Lisbon participating at the WYD 2023

The event was officially opened on August 1 with an open-air Mass celebrated by Manuel Clemente in Edward VII Park, with an estimated 180,000-310,000 people present.

=== 2 August ===
Pope Francis arrived in Portugal to attend the event for a five day period.

=== 3 August ===
A welcoming ceremony for Pope Francis took place at Edward VII Park in the afternoon.

=== 4 August ===
A "Catholic Influencers Festival" for social media influencers was hosted by the Vatican's Dicastery for Communication, advertised as "the 1st world in-person meeting of digital missionaries".

Pope Francis personally heard the confessions of three young people. In the evening, the pontiff led the Stations of the Cross in Edward VII Park. Rather than traveling to the different stations, he was led out onto the stage in a wheelchair and watched as a performance troupe choreographed each of the 14 stations. An estimated 800,000 young people attended.

=== 5 August ===
Pope Francis visited Fátima in the morning. In his remarks, he called for the Blessed Virgin Mary to be given the new title "Our Lady in a Hurry", relating to the theme of World Youth Day and describing how Mary hastens to care for her children. A 16-year-old girl Spanish World Youth Day pilgrim named Jimena who visited Fátima on the same day was reported to have miraculously recovered from 95% vision loss during mass at the site.

In the afternoon, over 1.5 million pilgrims walked to Parque Tejo in near 100-degree 100 °F (38 °C) heat in preparation for an evening vigil featuring Eucharistic adoration, presided by Pope Francis. The pontiff decided not to use his prepared remarks during his speech where he called the young people in attendance to be "joyous missionaries".

=== 6 August ===
Pope Francis celebrated mass on Sunday morning, with an estimated 1.5 million people in attendance. Following the mass, Pope Francis announced that World Youth Day 2027 would be held in Seoul, South Korea. In addition, a special event for young people would be held in Rome in 2025 to coincide with the Jubilee Year. This special event, the Jubilee for Teenagers, was originally intended to include the canonization of Carlo Acutis. Due to the death of Pope Francis, the canonization was postponed and many teenagers attended the funeral of Pope Francis instead. It just so happened that this special event, the Jubilee for Teenagers, occurred on the same weekend. Pope Francis concluded with a special prayer for Ukraine (due to the Russo-Ukrainian War) and said that he possesses a "dream of peace, the dream of young people praying for peace, living in peace and building a peaceful future."

== Logotype ==
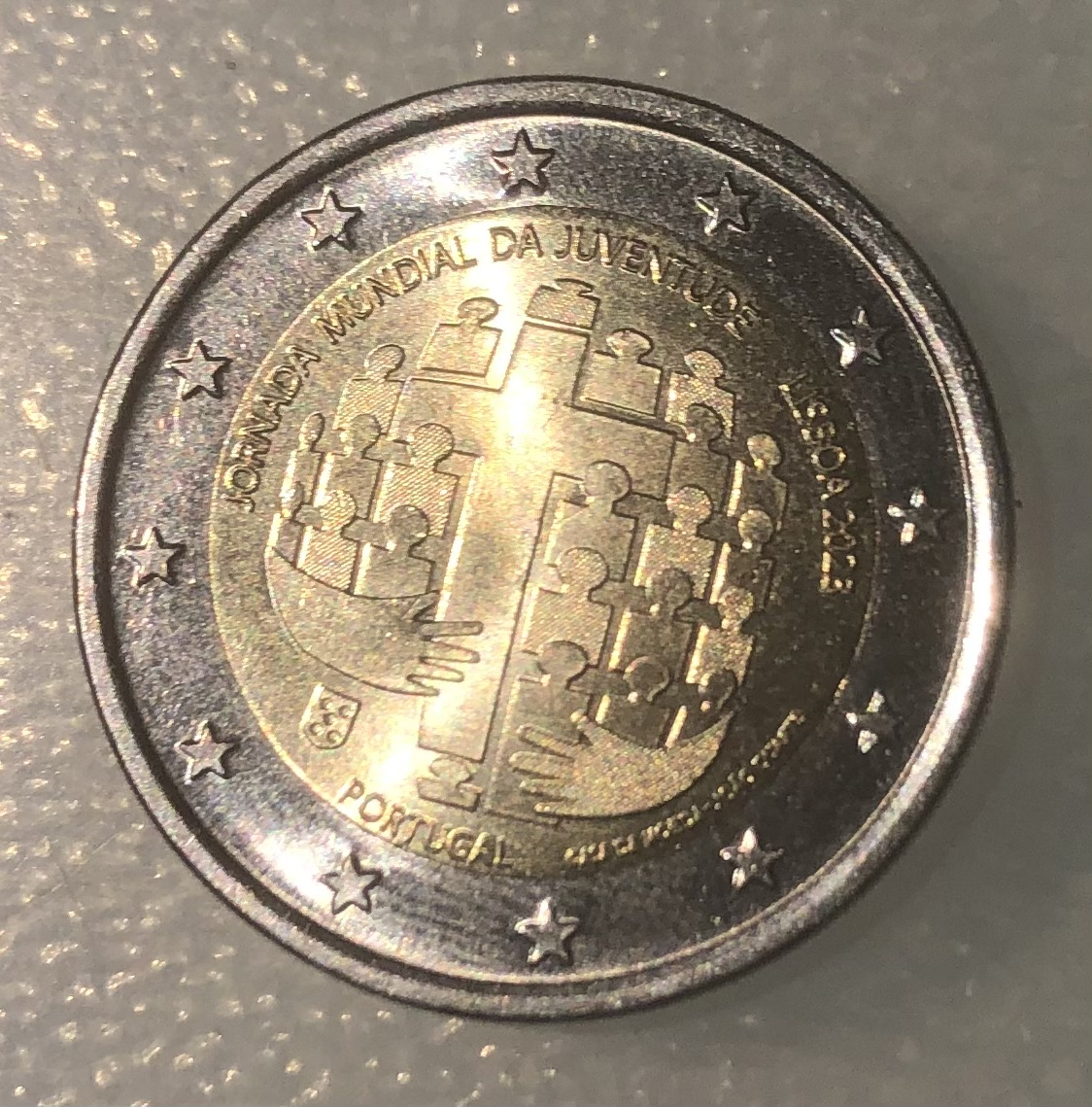
Limited edition Portuguese coin made for the WYD 2023

The WYD symbol was created by Portuguese designer Beatriz Roque Nunes (then 24 years old), who had studied in London and at the Faculty of Fine Arts in Lisbon. The logotype was unveiled on October 16, 2020. The central element of the logo, the Cross of Christ, clearly symbolizes the Christian religion, "God's infinite love for humankind". The color palette chosen —red, yellow and green— represents the flag of Portugal. In white, dividing the cross in half, a path is evoked, not only that which Mary travels "to live the will of God", but also that traversed by young people seeking their "renewal of inner strength, their dreams, the enthusiasm, the hope and the gratitude" (Christus Vivit, 20). A dynamic-looking yellow touch also symbolizes the Holy Spirit, and above it is a rosary celebrating the Portuguese devotion to Our Lady of Fatima, to which many go on pilgrimage. Finally, the profile of Mary as a young woman, as depicted in the Gospel of Luke (Lk 1:39), stands out.

== Official theme song ==
With lyrics by Father Paulo Vaz and music by Pedro Ferreira, both from the Diocese of Coimbra, the official hymn "There's a Rush in the Air" was released on January 27, 2021. The lyrics are based on the verse "Mary arose and ran with haste" (Lk 1:39), thus portraying Mary's "yes" and her haste to go and meet her cousin Elizabeth, as the biblical passage relates. The official theme was recorded in two versions: Portuguese and international, the latter containing similar versions of the stanza sung in Portuguese, English, French, Spanish and Italian.

== See also ==
- Medjugorje International Youth Festival
- Radio Maria
