= World Youth Day 2019 =

International Catholic youth event

- Date: 22 January 2019 – 27 January 2019
- Type: Youth festival
- Theme: I am the servant of the Lord. May it be done to me according to your word. (Lk 1:38)
- Organised by: Catholic Church
- Participants: Pope Francis
- Previous: 2016 Krakow
- Next: 2023 Lisbon

World Youth Day 2019 (Spanish: Jornada Mundial de la Juventud 2019) was the 16th World Youth Day, an international event organized by the Catholic Church and focused on faith and youth. Taking place 22–27 January in Panama City, Panama, it was the first of its kind celebrated in Central America.

Pope Francis announced plans for the event at the end of the closing Mass of World Youth Day 2016 in Brzegi near Kraków, Poland, on 31 July 2016.

== Theme ==
On 22 November 2016, Pope Francis announced the theme for World Youth Day 2019: I am the servant of the Lord. May it be done to me according to your word (Lk 1:38). The theme coincided with the goals of the XV Ordinary General Assembly of the Synod of Bishops on youth, faith and vocational discernment, held in 2018.

== Logo and Hymn ==
On 14 May 2017, the WYD 2019 logo was revealed during a Eucharistic meeting. The design was chosen from 103 proposals submitted to the Archdiocese of Panama in a contest that was won by Ambar Calvo, an architecture student. The Panama Canal appears as a symbol of the journey that pilgrims travel to Jesus guided by Mary. The pilgrim's cross also appears. The points mean two things: they are the crown of the Virgin, but also the pilgrims who are on their way to travel the continents.

Like the logo, the creation and edition of the official anthem was submitted to a contest, where several proposals were presented to the Archdiocese of Panama, which was conquered by Abdiel González. On 3 July, during the XLVII Bread and Wine Dinner held at the ATLAPA Convention Center, it was presented to around 3,000 people, in the presence of Panamanian bishops and President Juan Carlos Varela. The Archbishop of Panama, José Domingo Ulloa Mendieta, said that "this hymn expresses the mission to which we are called adisciples and missionaries in these times, following the example of the Virgin Mary". The hymn of the event was named Be It Done to Me, according to Your Word, and was launched by Archbishop Mendieta of Panama on 3 July 2017, in the Panamanian capital.

== Announcement ==
Pope Francis announced plans for the upcoming event at World Youth Day in Kraków on 31 July 2016. The president of Panama, Juan Carlos Varela, accompanied the announcement. Francis also said that he did not know if he would be on this journey as St. Peter's successor: "I do not know if I will be in Panama, but Peter will be."

== Journey ==
The main event center of this journey was Campo Santa Maria La Antigua. Panama City, provided for the pilgrims, in connection with the events of WYD, and the Park of Forgiveness Renew me, located in the Recreation Park Omar Torrijos, a space for the young people to have access to the vocational fair Follow Me. Between 22 January and 25 January, the afternoon periods in particular were marked by concerts and presentations by various Catholic bands, called the "Youth Festival", which had 33 venues, 7 official venues, 5 satellite venues, as well as other venue points of dance and theater presentations, plastic arts exhibitions, paintings and photography, and a foods space. Among the more than 20 artists confirmed, headliners included Canadian Matt Maher, Australian priest Rob Galea, winners of the 2018 Grammy Alfareros, rock nuns Siervas, and the Brazilian band Missionário Shalom. There was also the theme park called "Cristonautas". The theme of migrants was often mentioned by the Pope during this journey, which was attended by many young Venezuelans at a time when the country was going through a serious political and social crisis.

=== First day (22 January) ===
==== Opening ====
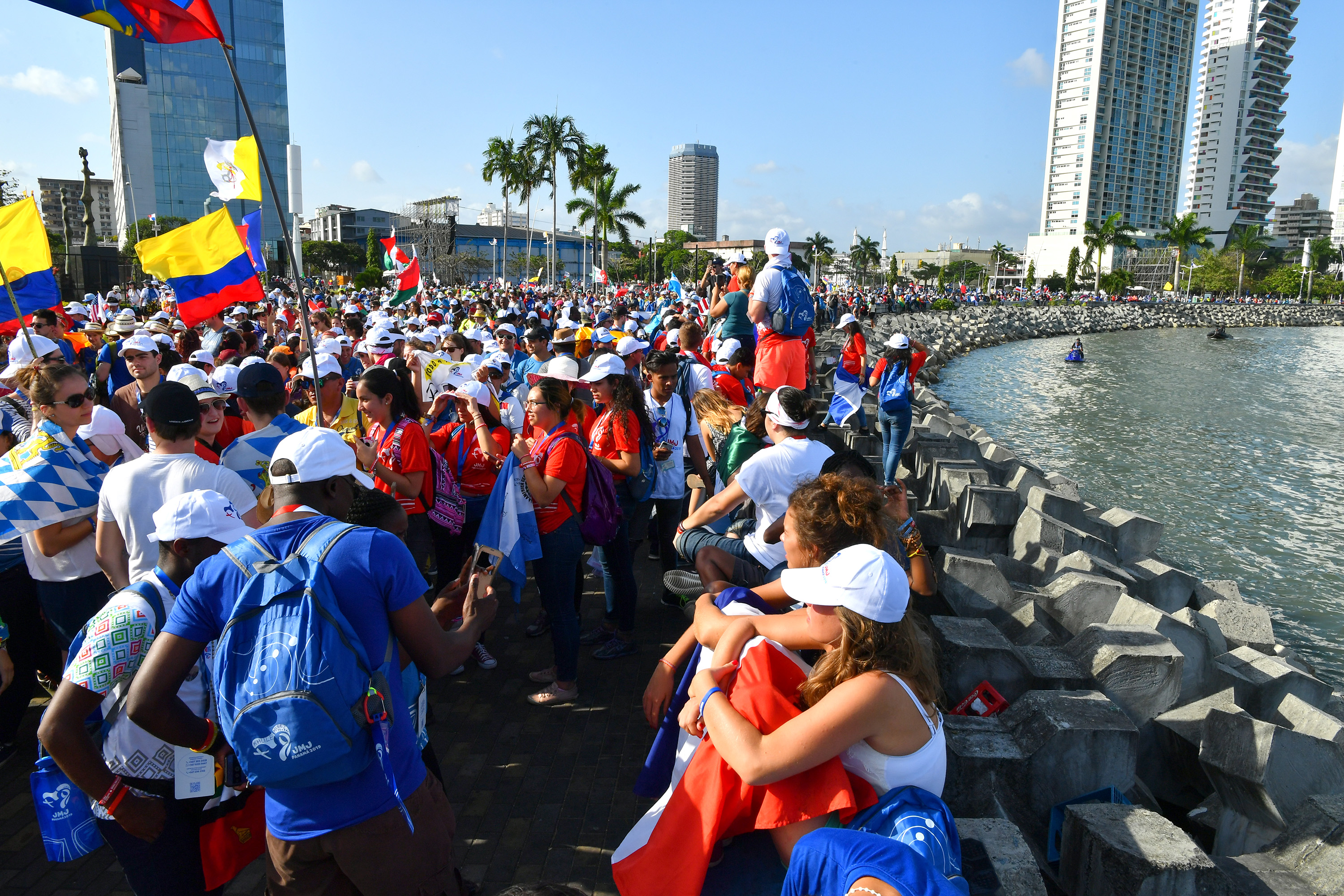
Participants gathering for the welcome ceremony along the Cinta Costera

The events began this day, in the Park of Forgiveness, the vocational fair, and in Cristonautas Park. The Opening Ceremony of the Day was held in the Campo Santa Maria La Antigua. In his homily, Archbishop Mendieta of Panama welcomed the pilgrims, saying: "Our joy is immense in the presence of all of you. Today we welcome you with open hearts and arms. Thank you for accepting the call to meet us in this small country where faith came hand in hand with the Virgin Mary under the title of Santa Maria La Antigua. A country that made every effort to have each of you have an encounter with Jesus Christ: the Way, Truth and Life." The archbishop recalled that Panama was the first diocese on the mainland of the Americas, where the Gospel was spread to the rest of the American continent, and spoke of gratitude to God for hosting this WYD: "Our people are ready to receive you, to share their traditions, multiethnic and pluricultural wealth, but in a very special way, share the joy of faith in a God who is acting among us in our personal and community history."

=== Second Day (23 January) ===
==== Catechesis ====
The first day of pilgrims' catecheses with the bishops took place.

==== Pope's arrival to Panama ====
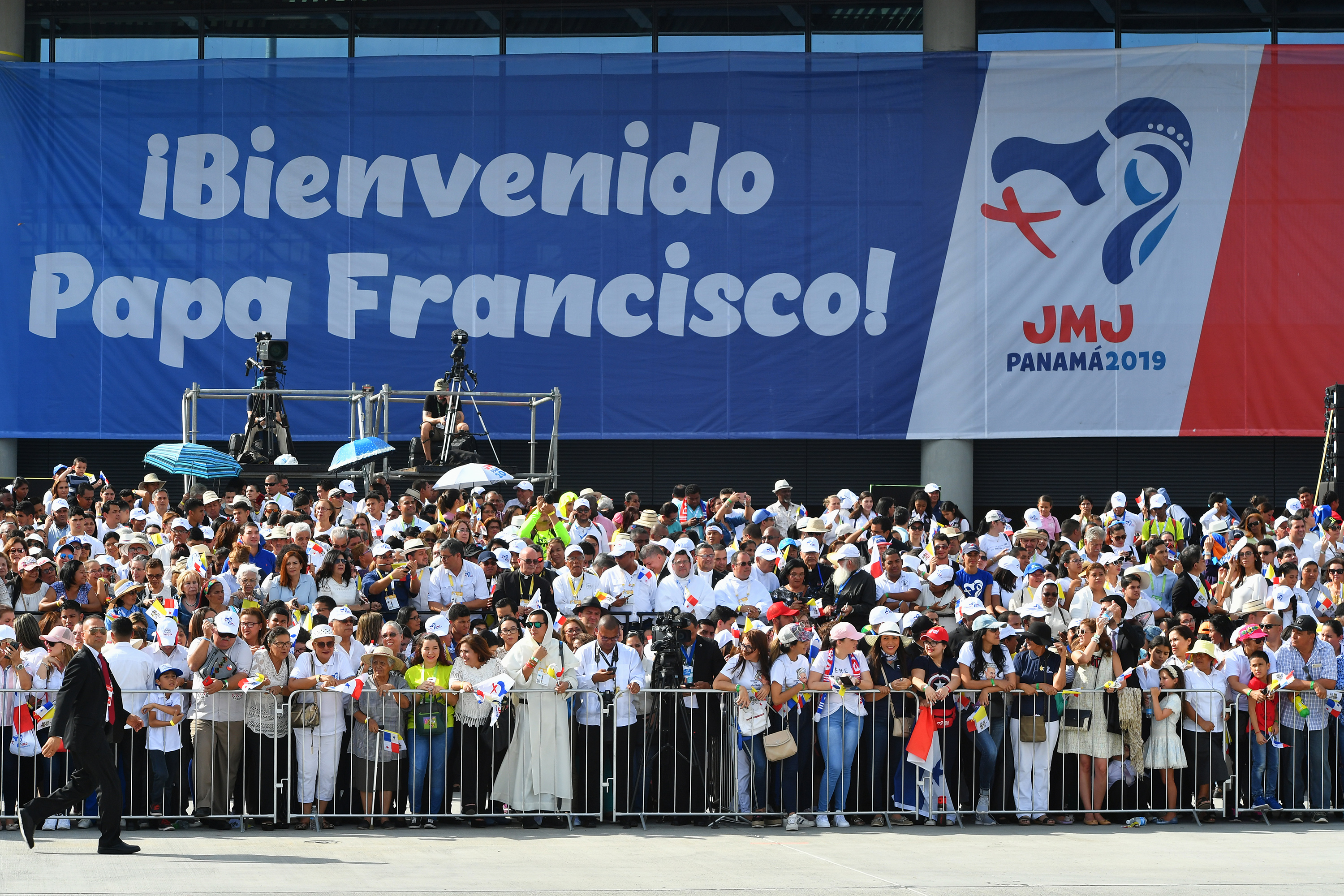
Participants awaiting the arrival of Pope Francis at the Tocumen International Airport

Pope Francis departed from Rome on 23 January, landing at Panama City Airport at 4:30 pm local time after a trip that included traveling 9,500 km over 10 countries during 13 hours' flying time. The Supreme Pontiff was received by the Panamanian President Varela, local bishops and about two thousand young people, who sang the well-known phrase in Spanish "This is the Pope's youth". No speeches or pronouncements were made, only the hymns of the Vatican and Panama. Pope Francis then traveled to the headquarters of the Apostolic Nunciature, where he stayed throughout the event. Thousands of people gathered along the avenues of the country's capital to greet the Pope.

==== Pardon Park ====
There was also a procession of the pilgrim image of Our Lady of Fatima, who had arrived from Portugal the day before, and shortly after the Holy Mass, presided over by the Archbishop Mendieta, there was the inauguration of the Park of Forgiveness, in which 200 confessionals were installed so that the young pilgrims could receive the Sacrament of Reconciliation. "Here thousands of young people will come to hear from the Lord of love, of forgiveness, that a new life begins," said the archbishop, who also assured that "the great majority of young people will not leave World Day without going through these confessionals." The 200 confessionals were manufactured by 35 inmates of the La Joya penitentiary complex. After the inauguration, Dom Mendieta was the first to confess, saying that he is "a sinner redeemed by the mercy of God. To truly confess it helps me a lot, especially in this time that I will have to help in the reconciliation of many on Friday that I will be with the Holy Father confessing the young people of the detention center."

=== Third day (24 January) ===
This day began with a welcome to Pope Francis in Palacio de las Garzas, received by the Panamanian president, to whom he gave an image of Santa Maria La Antigua in his first official event. In addition to the president, Francisco was received by the first lady Lorena Castillo, the cardinal José Luis Lacunza Maestrojuán and the archbishop of Panama, José Luis Ulloa Mendieta. Later he met with members of the Ministry of Foreign Affairs and with Central American bishops.

==== Catecheses ====
At the same time as the meeting of the authorities, the pilgrims of the journey met in their respective catecheses for the second day, whose theme was "Behold the handmaid of the Lord."

==== Opening ceremony ====
The official opening ceremony of WYD began this day. In his address to thousands of young people in Campo Santa Maria la Antigua, the Pope said to the young people:

I know that getting here was not easy. I know the efforts, the sacrifices you have made to participate in this Day. Many days of work and dedication, meetings of reflection and prayer, whose reward is, to a great extent, the way itself. The disciple is not only the one who comes to a place, but who starts with a decision, who is not afraid to risk and set out.

— Pope Francis to the youth in the opening ceremony.

=== Fourth Day (25 January) ===
==== Catecheses ====
Catecheses took place for the last day, whose theme was "Let it be done to me according to your will."

==== Las Garzas ====
The Pontiff was with 180 young people in the Center of Compliance of Minors, in Las Garzas. The Pope was welcomed by Archbishop Mendieta and the national director of the Institute of Interdisciplinary Studies, Emma Alba Tejeda. The young people sang "The prayer of the poor". Francis also heard a testimony of the intern Luis Oscar Martínez.

My life has been difficult: when I was one year old, my father abandoned my mother. She went on in the battle of life, not just with me, but with my sister and my brother. When I was growing up, I felt that something was missing, that there was an emptiness within me. Today I know that this missing something was the voice of a father who guided me with love. In 2015, God touched my heart and made the decision to accept Christ as my Lord and Savior. That day I again had a father. But some time later I tripped and committed a crime. I did not imagine that would have serious consequences, like losing part of my family, my studies and being in a place like this. [...]. There are no words to describe the freedom I feel at this moment.

— Luis Oscar Martinez to Pope Francis

The Pope emphasized the Gospel of Luke (Luke 15: 2) in the homily when the Pharisees and scribes attempted to condemn Christ for sitting at the table with those who were considered sinners.

Jesus is not afraid of approaching those who, for innumerable reasons, carried the weight of social hatred, as in the case of publicans – let us remember that publicans were enriching themselves by robbing their own people, provoking much indignation – or the weight of their guilt, errors, and deceit, as in the case of those who were known sinners. He does it because he knows that in heaven there is more joy for one converted sinner than for ninety-nine just who do not need conversion. [...]. By eating with publicans and sinners, Jesus breaks the logic that separates, excludes, isolates and falsely divides between good and bad.

— Homily of the Pope to the inmates of Las Garzas

After the Penitential Liturgy, some of the young prisoners were able to confess to the Holy Father and to some bishops. The Pope also greeted another 30 detainees who participated in the manufacture of the 250 confessionals used in WYD Panama. Pope Francis gave to the inmates an iron sculpture of Christ on the Cross outlined by olive branches.

==== Via Sacra ====
In the evening, about 400,000 people participated in the Via Sacra, which was presided over by the Pope and held in Campo Santa Maria la Antigua. The theme chosen for this moment was "reality of the young and the Martyr Church".

Young people of Latin America prayed the 14 stations that portray the journey of Christ to Calvary, remembering the sufferings present today throughout the world. The young people of Brazil, for example, performed for the eighth station the passage of the Gospel of Mark 15:21 on Simon of Cyrene, with the additional message "May the cross of others be our cross. Let us be united and take with love the immense cross of the world", and that young people who feel defeated should not lose hope.

In his reflection, the Pontiff said:

Jesus' path to Calvary is a path of suffering and solitude that continues in our day. He walks and suffers on so many faces that suffer the satisfied and numbing indifference of our consuming and consuming society, which is ignored and ignored in the pain of his brothers. [...]. We too, friends of the Lord, let ourselves be carried away by apathy and inactivity. So many times he defeated us and paralyzed conformity. It was difficult to recognize the Lord in the suffering brother: we looked away, not to see; we take refuge in the noise, not to hear; we cover our mouths so we do not scream. Be a friend in victories and glory, in success and in applause. It is easier to be close to those who are considered popular and winning.

— Reflection of Pope Francis on the Way of the Cross

The Pope concluded his speech saying:

"We want to be a Church that supports and accompanies, who knows how to say 'I am here', in the lives and crosses of so many Christians who walk beside us."

=== Fifth day (January 26) ===
==== Basilica ====
Pope Francis presided at the morning the Mass consecrating the altar of the Cathedral Basilica of Santa Maria la Antigua. The priests, consecrated men, and lay movements of Panama participated in the Mass. During the celebration, the Pope performed the rite of dedication of the altar of the cathedral, where relics of three Latin American saints were placed: Rose of Lima, Óscar Romero, Martin of Porres, and a Polish saint, John Paul II; this became the first cathedral of America whose altar was consecrated by a pontiff.

==== Lunch ====
In the afternoon the Holy Father had a private lunch in the Major Seminary of St. Joseph with a group of 10 young people who participated in WYD, 5 boys and 5 girls, of different nationalities representing the 5 continents.

==== Vigil ====
After that, at night time, ending the day, the Pope presided over the vigil with about 600,000 young people in Campo São João Paulo II. The pilgrim image of Our Lady of Fatima was present throughout the event. The crowd was invited to listen to three testimonies: the first was that of Erika de Bucktron, mother of four children, and the youngest has Down syndrome, and it was recommended to her to perform an abortion of the latter. The second testimony was Alfredo Martínez Andrión, 20, who was a choirboy in his childhood, but the poverty of his family forced him to leave school to work. He fell into drugs and was arrested, but found help at the St. John Paul II Foundation. Finally came the testimony of 26-year-old Nirmeen Odeh of Palestine, who considered that although she was baptized she should stay away from Christianity. However, at World Youth Day 2016, she said she discovered the love of Jesus. Later, through books like The Confessions of St. Augustine, she strengthened her faith. After the testimonies, Francis gave a speech, assuring the youth: "Mary shows the power of God. With a few words, she knew how to say yes, trusting in the love and promises of God, the only force capable of making all things new."

=== Sixth day (27 January) ===
==== Closing Mass ====
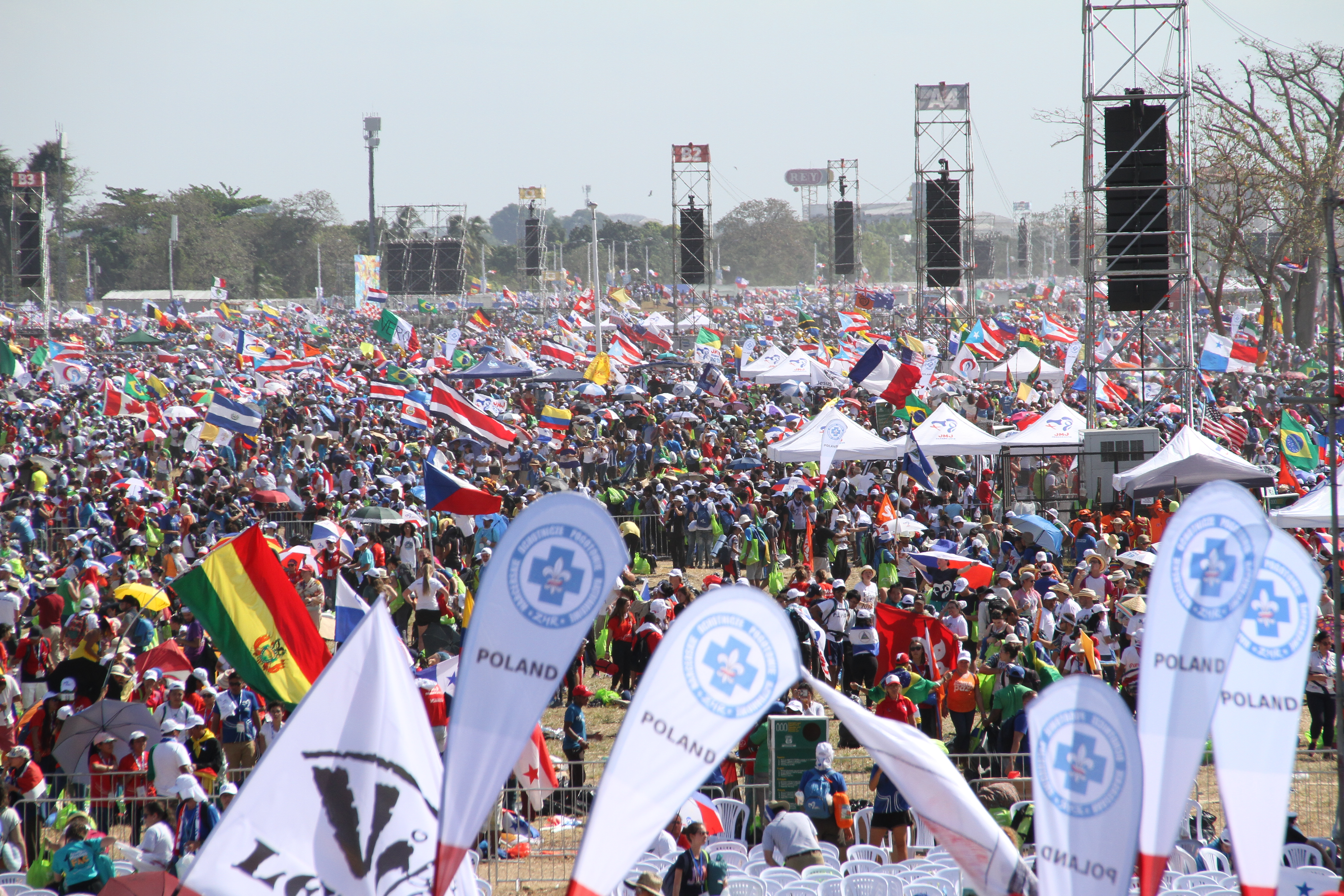
Pilgrims attending the closing mass.

Pope Francis began his day with the closing Mass of WYD. At the beginning of the celebration, the Pope was addressed by Archbishop José Domingo Ulloa Mendieta, who thanked the opportunity given to the country to organize this edition of WYD:

Thank you for allowing us to prepare and celebrate this Marian-flavored Journey with an American and Caribbean style, with spaces for prayer, formation, renewal and pastoral conversion. As a fruit of WYD, our Church in Central America is strengthened in its pastoral structure, in its ecclesial communion, and more alive in its missionary commitment, so as to proclaim with passion the Gospel.

— Dom José Domingo Ulloa Mendieta to Pope Francisco

The Pontiff invited the young people to take up their "missionary call now, and not in the future, following the example of Mary who said, 'Let it be done to me according to your word.' " About 700,000 pilgrims were present at the Campo São João Paulo II – Metro Park. The passage from the Gospel that initiates the public life of Jesus was reflected in the homily's reference to the synagogue where Isaiah's prophecy had been fulfilled: "Jesus reveals the now of God, who comes to meet us, to call us also to take part in his now 'to proclaim the Good News'."

We do not always believe that God can be so concrete in our daily lives, so close and real, and even less that He makes himself present by acting through someone we know, such as a neighbor, a friend, a relative. It is not uncommon for us to behave like Jesus' townsfolk in Nazareth, preferring a God at a distance: magnificent, good, generous but distant and not bothersome. Because a close God in everyday life, a friend and brother, asks us to learn closeness, daily presence and, above all, fraternity. (...) God is real, because love is real; God is concrete because love is concrete.

— Homily of Pope Francis at the closing Mass of WYD 2019

At the end of the Mass, the Pope prayed to Our Lady, entrusting to her the young people of the whole world, and said goodbye to the pilgrims, announcing the site of the next WYD in 2022, in Lisbon, Portugal:

To you, dear young people, a big thank you! Your faith and joy made Panama, America, and the whole world vibrate. We are on the way: continue to walk, continue to live the faith and share it. Do not forget that you are not tomorrow, you are not the 'however', but the now of God. The site of the next World Youth Day has been announced. I ask you not to let cool what you have lived in these days. Return to your parishes and communities, to your families and to your friends, and pass on this experience, so that others may vibrate with the strength and the dream that you have in you. With Mary, continue to say "yes" to the dream that God sowed in you.

— WYD 2019 closure by Pope Francis

Present at this Mass were the presidents of Panama, Juan Carlos Varela; of Costa Rica, Carlos Alvarado; of Colombia, Iván Duque; of Guatemala, Jimmy Morales; of El Salvador, Salvador Sánchez Cerén; and Honduras, Juan Orlando Hernández.

==== House of the Good Samaritan ====
After Mass, the Pope went to the Good Samaritan House, presenting the place with an image of the Good Shepherd.

==== Meeting with volunteers and farewell ====
In his last appearance in Panama, before the 19,500 volunteers of the Journey, the Pope made a speech with which he concluded his visit. Three of these young people made a brief address to the Pope, expressing their experiences of volunteering and participating in WYD. Archbishop Mendieta spoke briefly, thanking the Pope for his example and assuring the Pontiff of their prayers: "Count on the prayer of this youth." The Pope took leave of the authorities and departed for Rome.

== Patron saints ==
- Óscar Romero
- María la Antigua
- José Sánchez del Río (Christian martyr)
- Juan Diego (messenger of the Virgin of Guadalupe)
- María Romero Meneses (religious of the Daughters of Mary Help of Christians and founder of social works for the most needy)
- John Bosco (patron of youth)
- Pope John Paul II (initiator of WYD)
- Martin de Porres (Dominican and first African saint of America)
- Rose of Lima (mystic, the first saint of America)
