= Halleluya Festival =

- Date: July (Fortaleza); May 31, 2025 (New York City); Variable dates (other cities)
- Location: Fortaleza, Ceará, Brazil (main event) Brooklyn, New York City, United States Other cities and countries
- Type: Music and evangelization festival
- Organized by: Shalom Catholic Community
- Website: www.festivalhalleluya.com

The Halleluya Festival is a Catholic music festival organized by the Shalom Catholic Community, recognized as one of the largest events of its kind in Latin America. First held in 1997, its main edition occurs annually in Fortaleza, Ceará, Brazil, typically in July, drawing approximately 1.2 million attendees over five days. The festival blends performances by national and international Catholic artists with evangelization activities, sports, arts, and solidarity initiatives, offering free admission to the public. In 2025, the festival will expand to New York City, with an edition scheduled for May 31 in Brooklyn, marking its debut in the United States.

Beyond Fortaleza, the Halleluya Festival is held in other Brazilian cities, including São Luís (Maranhão), Natal (Rio Grande do Norte), Teresina (Piauí), São Paulo, and Rio de Janeiro, as well as international editions during World Youth Day (WYD) since 2013.

== History ==
The Halleluya Festival was launched in 1997 by the Shalom Catholic Community in Fortaleza to evangelize youth through arts and music. Starting modestly, it grew rapidly into a major event for youth evangelization in Brazil. By 2024, the Fortaleza edition celebrated its 27th occurrence, cementing its position as a leading festival of its type in the country.

The festival expanded to other Brazilian cities in the 2000s and went global in 2013 with WYD editions in cities like Rio de Janeiro (2013), Kraków (2016), and Panama (2019). In 2025, it will debut in New York City on May 31 in Brooklyn, featuring artists such as Mike Delouis, Marisel Music, Morelzinho (performing Brazilian Pagode), and Missionário Shalom, marking a significant international milestone. During the COVID-19 pandemic (2020-2021), the festival shifted to hybrid or virtual formats, resuming full in-person events in 2022.

== Structure ==
The main event in Fortaleza is held at the Condomínio Espiritual Uirapuru (CEU), an open-air venue, with free entry. It features various thematic areas:

- Main Stage: Showcases artists like Rosa de Saron, Adriana Arydes, and Missionário Shalom.
- Alternative Stage: Hosts smaller, experimental performances.
- Adventure Space: Offers extreme activities such as zip-lining, skateboarding, and biking tracks.
- Mercy Space: Provides confessions and spiritual counseling.
- Electronic Tent: Features Christian electronic music.
- Kids Space: Includes activities for children.
- Games Space: Offers electronic and interactive games.

Food stalls throughout the venue generate funds to support the free event. The NYC edition’s structure is yet to be detailed but is expected to adapt these elements to a Brooklyn venue.

== Solidarity ==
Since 2008, the festival has collaborated with **Hemoce** (Hematology and Hemotherapy Center of Ceará) to promote blood donation and bone marrow donor registration. In Fortaleza, it collects around three tons of non-perishable food per edition, donated to Shalom Community projects and underserved communities.

== Cultural Impact ==
The Halleluya Festival attracts a wide range of attendees, including youth from diverse subcultures like skaters and gamers, as well as rural caravans from Ceará. It serves as an extension of the Shalom Community’s evangelizing charism, leveraging contemporary youth culture to promote Christian values. The festival also elevates the Brazilian Catholic music scene by spotlighting artists nationally.

== See also ==
- Shalom Catholic Community
- Catholic Charismatic Renewal
- World Youth Day
