= Lay Claretian Movement =

The Lay Claretian Movement is a lay movement of the Catholic Church especially called to Evangelization through the Word of God in all its forms, the testimony and the transforming action of the realities in which they are embedded. They have San Antonio Maria Claret as inspirational and spiritual father, and together with the institutions founded by him, constitute the Claretian family. It was born in Villa de Leyva, Colombia, on July 8, 1983 during his first General Assembly. It was built as an international association of the faithful of private law by the Pontifical Council for the Laity on April 20, 1988. The decree of erection was signed by the President of the Congregation, Cardinal Bishop Eduardo Pironio.

== Structure ==
The MSC is organized locally, regionally and internationally. The incorporation in the movement is pending of admission to one of their local communities. The whole community of a given region is regional. The regions are coordinated by the Regional Assembly and the Regional Council. Currently there are regions of Argentina, Uruguay, Andalusia (southern Spain), Bolivia, Brazil, Paraguay, Caribbean, Chile, Colombia, Nigeria, Northern Spain and Venezuela, although there are also communities in Angola, Canada, Congo, England, United States, Guatemala, Equatorial Guinea, Honduras, Italy, Mexico, Panama, Peru, Poland, and Russia.

The coordination of the international Movement rests with the General Assembly, as part of the General Council members, representatives of the regional councils, delegates from local groups, and the General Council, composed of members elected by the Assembly General.
