= Shalom Catholic Community =

Church association in Fortaleza, Brazil,

- Comunidade Católica Shalom
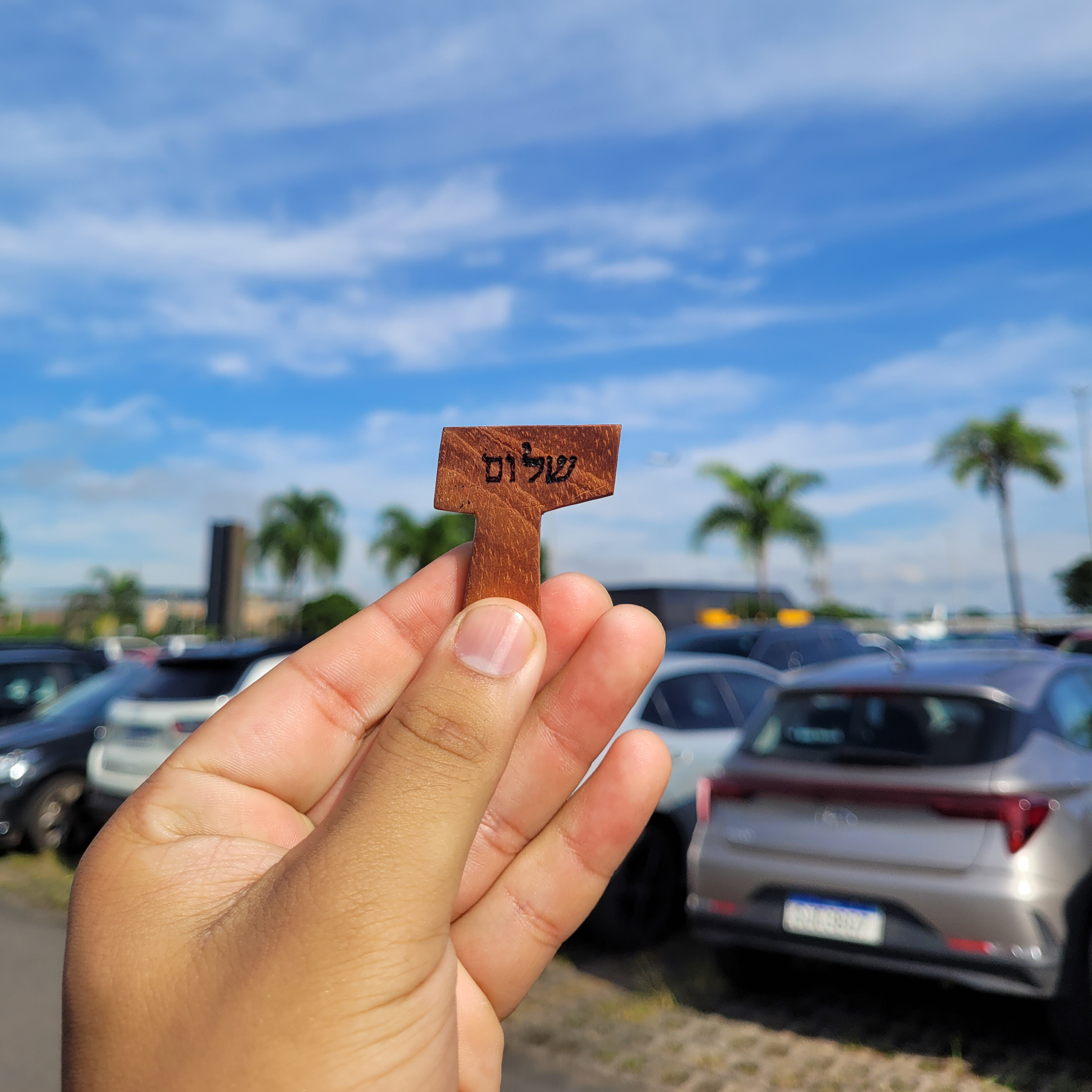
- The Tau, symbol adopted by members after postulancy

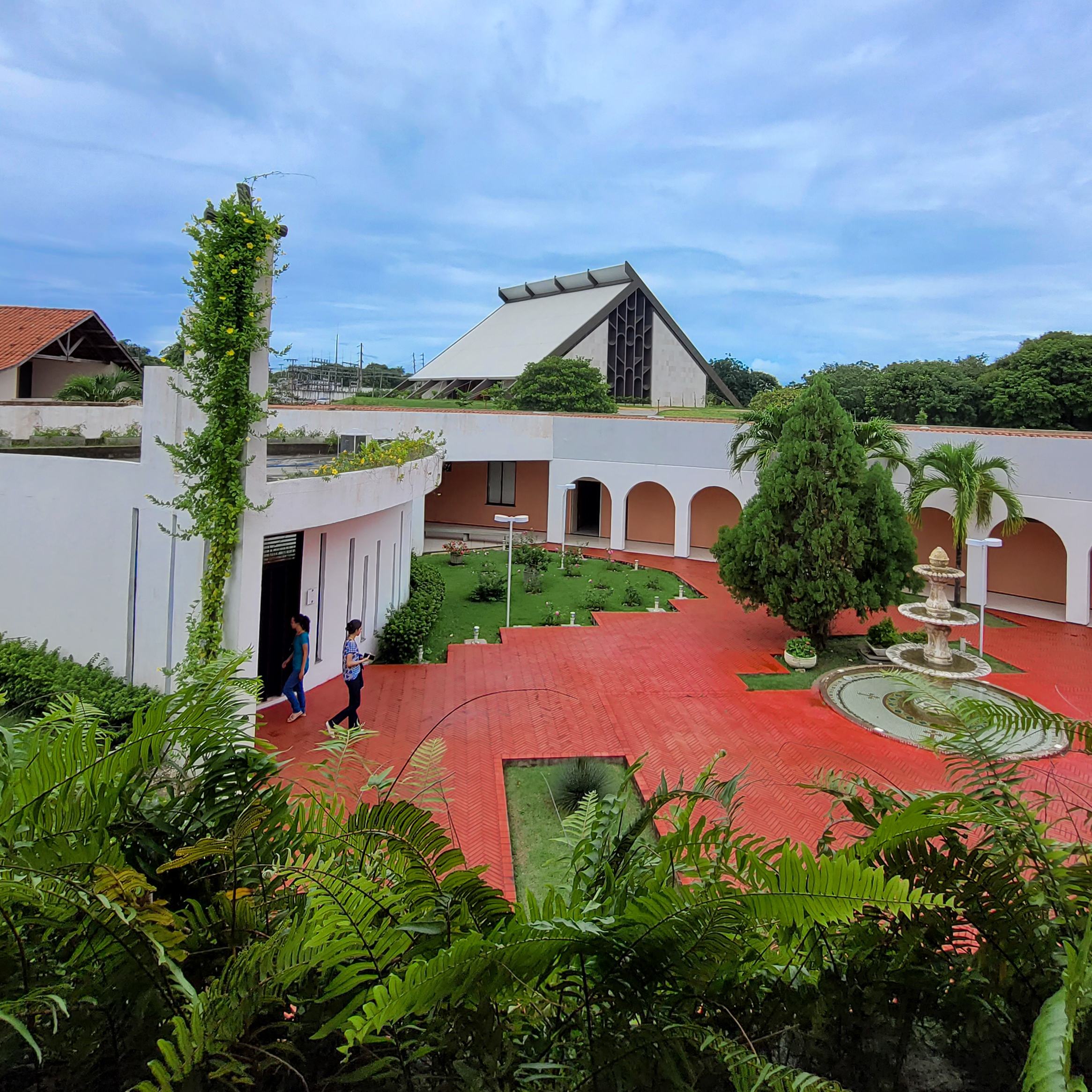
- Courtyard of the Shalom Community headquarters in Aquiraz, Ceará, Brazil
- Abbreviation: CCSh
- Named after: Shalom (Hebrew for "peace")
- Pronunciation: /ʃəˈloʊm/
- Motto: John 20:19
- Established: July 9, 1982; 44 years ago (44 years ago)
- Founders: Moysés Louro de Azevedo Filho, Maria Emmir Nogueira
- Founded at: Fortaleza, Ceará, Brazil
- Types: International Private Association of Faithful
- Purpose: Evangelization and promotion of peace through reconciliation
- Aim: Evangelization with focus on youth, families, children, and the poor
- Headquarters: Diaconia Geral, Aquiraz, Ceará, Brazil
- Country: Brazil
- Area served: Over 160 dioceses in 40+ countries
- Method: Prayer groups, evangelization centers, arts, media, works of mercy
- Membership: ~1,600 (Life Community), ~11,000 (Covenant Community), ~20,000 (Shalom Work)
- Official Languages: Portuguese
- Directors: Moysés (General Moderator)
- Parent organisations: Catholic Church
- Part of: Catholic Charismatic Renewal
- Affiliations: Catholic Church, Catholic Charismatic Renewal
- Website: www.comshalom.org/en/

The Shalom Catholic Community (Portuguese: Comunidade Católica Shalom, abbreviated CCSh) is an International Private Association of Faithful within the Catholic Church, founded on July 9, 1982, in Fortaleza, Ceará, Brazil, by Moysés Azevedo. Affiliated with the Catholic Charismatic Renewal, its charism is the experience of "peace" (Shalom), understood as reconciliation with God, oneself, and others through an encounter with the Risen Jesus Christ, characterized by creative courage, hospitality, and missionary zeal. Recognized by the Holy See in 2007, it operates in over 160 dioceses across more than 40 countries, with its headquarters at the Diaconia Geral in Aquiraz, Ceará.

== History ==
=== Context and Foundation ===
The Shalom Catholic Community emerged in the post-Second Vatican Council era, during a time of ecclesial renewal marked by the Catholic Charismatic Renewal and lay evangelization, encouraged by Pope John Paul II. During the X National Eucharistic Congress in Fortaleza in 1980, Moysés Azevedo, then 20 years old, offered his life for the evangelization of youth to Pope John Paul II, with the blessing of Archbishop Aloísio Lorscheider. Inspired by this encounter, Azevedo established a snack bar as an evangelization center, inaugurated on July 9, 1982, during a Eucharistic celebration attended by Lorscheider. Maria Emmir Nogueira, co-founder, joined in 1983, contributing to its early consolidation. The community's foundational documents, the Escritos (1984, 1986, 2005) and Estatutos (2010), define its charism and mission.

=== Expansion and Recognition ===
From the 1990s, the community expanded across Brazil and internationally, reaching countries such as France, Canada, and Italy, totaling over 160 dioceses in more than 40 countries by 2018. It received archdiocesan approval between 1996 and 1998 under Cláudio Hummes and pontifical recognition in 2007 as an International Private Association of Faithful. During the general audience on March 14, 2007, Pope Benedict XVI greeted the Shalom Community from Fortaleza, expressing hopes that it would strengthen its missionary consciousness and contribute to unity in truth and love. Its statutes were approved in 2012 by Benedict XVI. In 2017, approximately 3,000 members were received by Pope Francis at the Vatican. In 2022, during the community's 40th anniversary, members renewed their life offering in Rome before Pope Francis, reaffirming their ecclesial commitment. The Halleluya Festival, launched in 1997, became a milestone in youth evangelization.

== Charism and Spirituality ==
The Shalom charism is rooted in the greeting of the Risen Jesus («Peace be with you», John 20:19-26), expressing reconciliation with God, oneself, and others through spousal love, contemplation, unity, and evangelization. It is characterized by creative courage, hospitality, and missionary zeal, reflected in global initiatives. Its spirituality includes:

- Contemplation: Daily personal prayer (1 hour), Bible study (1 hour), daily Eucharist, weekly adoration of the Blessed Sacrament, and monthly reconciliation.
- Spousal Love: Inspired by Saint Francis of Assisi (detachment) and Saint Teresa of Ávila (contemplative prayer), it calls for unconditional love of Christ.
- Unity: Reflects Trinitarian communion, embracing celibates, married couples, and priests in fraternity.
- Marian Dimension: The Virgin Mary, as Queen of Peace, serves as a model of surrender and trust.
- Praise and Penance: Charismatic praise (prayer in tongues, singing) and penitential practices on Fridays, with emphasis on liturgical seasons.

Saint Thérèse of Lisieux, intercessor for youth, and Saint Joseph, patron of the Shalom Work, complement the patrons Saint Francis and Saint Teresa, as guided by Archbishop Aloísio Lorscheider. Practices such as the baptism in the Holy Spirit and glossolalia characterize its charismatic spirituality. The Tau, worn around the neck, symbolizes election and discipleship.

== Mission ==
The Shalom mission is to evangelize boldly, focusing on youth, families, children, and the poor through prayer groups, evangelization centers, arts, media, and works of mercy, promoting unity in truth and love. Inspired by parresia (boldness), it forms missionary disciples who integrate secular activities with sanctification. The Halleluya Festival, Acamps, seminars, and social projects reflect its creative courage and hospitality.

== Structure and Organization ==
Member	Community (Life and Covenant)				Work	
Member	Consecrated		Formation		Work	
Stages	Definitive	Temporary Promises (T)	Disciple (D)	Postulant (P)	Vocations (V)	Sheep
Sign				None		

=== Communities ===
The community is organized into:

- Life Community (CV): Approximately 1,600 members live in communal houses, taking vows of poverty, chastity, and obedience.
- Covenant Community (CAl): Approximately 11,000 members integrate the charism into their family and professional lives through Community Cells.

The Shalom Work, with about 20,000 participants, includes supporters in prayer groups and events. The community encompasses youth, families, celibates, and priests, reflecting its diversity.

=== Formation ===
Formation occurs in stages (Postulancy, Discipleship, Temporary Promises, and Definitive Promises), respecting vocational freedom and discernment, as guided by Pope Francis. The Life Community follows an ascetic routine (daily Mass, Liturgy of the Hours, morning silence), while the Covenant Community adapts these practices.

=== Governance ===
The community is led by the General Moderator, Moysés Azevedo (foundational phase), elected for five-year terms, with a General Council. In each diocese, a Local Responsible and a Local Council administer the community in communion with bishops.

== Administration ==
The community relies on Divine Providence, with Saint Joseph as its patron. Communal sharing is practiced: Covenant Community members allocate 10% of their income to the Shalom Work and contribute to a Community Fund for the poor. The General Econome and Local Economes manage resources.

== Cultural and Social Impact ==
The community exerts cultural influence through the Halleluya Festival (since 1997), which draws crowds with Catholic music and youth evangelization. Its compositions, published in Cantai a Deus com Alegria, and icons like the "Prince of Peace" express spousal love. Shalom FM 91.7 (Fortaleza, since 2019) and a strong digital presence (319,000 Instagram followers, 610,000 on Facebook, 350,000 YouTube subscribers in 2022) amplify its message. Social projects in impoverished neighborhoods and parish support reflect its commitment to mercy. The community fosters vocations, conversions, and families, responding to youth desires for radical faith, as noted in the 2018 Synod on Youth.

== Sociological Analysis ==
The Shalom Community is recognized for its strong sense of identity, fostered through formative processes that integrate laity into charismatic spirituality. Moysés Azevedo’s leadership, legitimized by his encounter with John Paul II, blends charisma and institutionalization, challenging Weber’s theory of charisma routinization. Maria Emmir Nogueira complements this with formation and writings. Its supernatural emphasis may limit autonomy of conscience, diverging from post-Medellín Latin American spirituality, which prioritizes social justice.

== Contemporary Challenges ==
While unifying, the charismatic spirituality may disconnect from daily life, limiting engagement with social justice and ecology. Its digital activism raises concerns about self-referentiality. Pope Francis urges the community to respect vocational freedom and remain open to the Holy Spirit, discerning its future during its foundational phase.

== See also ==
- Catholic Charismatic Renewal
- Canção Nova Community
- Igreja do Ressuscitado
- Halleluya Festival
- Pope John Paul II
