= Couples for Christ =

International Catholic lay ecclesial movement

Founder
- Ang Ligaya ng Panginoon (Filipino for “The Joy of the Lord”)

Religions
- Christianity (Catholicism)

Website
- www.couplesforchristglobal.org

The Couples for Christ (CFC) is an international Catholic lay ecclesial movement whose goal is to renew and strengthen Christian values. It is one of 123 International Associations of the Faithful.

The organization is linked to the Vatican through the Pontifical Council for the Laity, and is led by an International Council based in the Philippines under the Catholic Bishops' Conference of the Philippines. The community consists of family ministries, social arms, and anti-abortion ministries.

== History ==
Couples for Christ (CFC) was established in 1981 by the charismatic community Ang Ligaya ng Panginoon (LNP; Filipino for "The Joy of the Lord") in Manila. Its target groups were primarily married couples, inviting prospective couples to a private home for a series of weekly gospel discussions.

Since 1993, CFC had also started other demographic-specific groups, including "Kids for Christ," "Youth for Christ," "Singles for Christ," "Handmaids of the Lord" and "Servants of the Lord."

In 1996, CFC was approved by the Catholic Bishops' Conference of the Philippines as a National Private Association of Lay Faithful and recognized in 2000 by the Holy See as a private international association of the lay faithful of Pontifical Right.

CFC is present in dioceses across all 81 Philippine provinces and 163 countries. It sent participants to the Extraordinary Synod on the Family organised by Pope Francis in 2014.

== Membership and sections ==
Any married couple can become members of CFC, provided the organization acknowledges their marriage as valid. Although a Catholic movement/organization, CFC also accepts non-Catholic Christians.

New members must attend a series of seminars known as the “Christian Life Program” (CLP). After this, couples who agree to commit themselves to active participation in the organization are placed in a cell group called "households," consisting of 4 to 7 couples under the pastoral care of a couple as a household head.

The CLP is also mandatory for those who wish to join one of the organization's other, demographic specific groups such as Singles for Christ.

== Evangelization Approaches ==
=== Christian Life Program Revised ===
In 2014, an update of the Christian Life Program has been released to reflect that CFC is explicitly Catholic, truly global, and devotedly Marian.

=== ANCOP ===
ANCOP stands for Answering the Cry of the Poor. It is an umbrella program made for the purpose of consolidating CFC's efforts in 'Building the Church of the Poor,' essentially a social outreach undertaking. Shelter-building for the poor and child-education sponsorship are among its dominant sub-programs. Certain aspects affecting the society are also being addressed through the ANCOP program, such as health, education, livelihood and community development activities.

As a social outreach program, ANCOP also involves sectors such as migrants and their families, uniformed personnel, those in prison, and environment stakeholders. Through ANCOP, sub-organizations like cooperatives and mini-programs like the Cornerstone have materialized.

=== Cornerstone ===
This is a program of CFC and its Family ministries in the cooperation with Ateneo Center for Educational Development. The main objective of this program is to help grades 2 and 3 students in public schools on how to read and understand English. SFC members take the lead in teaching the students and providing them Values formation activities.

=== Ablaze Communications ===
ABLAZE Communications, or simply "ABLAZE" is registered as a subsidiary of Couples for Christ. It is involved in the production of audio-visual presentations and merchandizing of products.

=== Liveloud ===
Liveloud is an annual praise and worship event first staged in 2009 featuring Catholic Christian music.

=== Anti-divorce law campaign ===
The CFC has opposed the legality of divorce in the Philippines. In June 2024, it published a manifesto arguing against divorces.
